

538001–538100 

|-bgcolor=#E9E9E9
| 538001 ||  || — || January 7, 2016 || Haleakala || Pan-STARRS ||  || align=right data-sort-value="0.91" | 910 m || 
|-id=002 bgcolor=#fefefe
| 538002 ||  || — || July 29, 2014 || Haleakala || Pan-STARRS ||  || align=right data-sort-value="0.59" | 590 m || 
|-id=003 bgcolor=#fefefe
| 538003 ||  || — || May 4, 2009 || Mount Lemmon || Mount Lemmon Survey ||  || align=right data-sort-value="0.71" | 710 m || 
|-id=004 bgcolor=#E9E9E9
| 538004 ||  || — || August 17, 2013 || Haleakala || Pan-STARRS ||  || align=right | 2.3 km || 
|-id=005 bgcolor=#E9E9E9
| 538005 ||  || — || October 12, 2009 || Mount Lemmon || Mount Lemmon Survey ||  || align=right | 2.7 km || 
|-id=006 bgcolor=#E9E9E9
| 538006 ||  || — || March 17, 2012 || Catalina || CSS ||  || align=right | 3.6 km || 
|-id=007 bgcolor=#E9E9E9
| 538007 ||  || — || November 16, 2010 || Mount Lemmon || Mount Lemmon Survey ||  || align=right | 1.1 km || 
|-id=008 bgcolor=#fefefe
| 538008 ||  || — || May 1, 2009 || Mount Lemmon || Mount Lemmon Survey ||  || align=right data-sort-value="0.84" | 840 m || 
|-id=009 bgcolor=#fefefe
| 538009 ||  || — || October 22, 2003 || Kitt Peak || Spacewatch ||  || align=right data-sort-value="0.91" | 910 m || 
|-id=010 bgcolor=#fefefe
| 538010 ||  || — || January 3, 2016 || Haleakala || Pan-STARRS ||  || align=right data-sort-value="0.64" | 640 m || 
|-id=011 bgcolor=#fefefe
| 538011 ||  || — || February 3, 2009 || Kitt Peak || Spacewatch ||  || align=right data-sort-value="0.64" | 640 m || 
|-id=012 bgcolor=#fefefe
| 538012 ||  || — || February 1, 2009 || Kitt Peak || Spacewatch ||  || align=right data-sort-value="0.53" | 530 m || 
|-id=013 bgcolor=#fefefe
| 538013 ||  || — || December 27, 2011 || Mount Lemmon || Mount Lemmon Survey ||  || align=right data-sort-value="0.77" | 770 m || 
|-id=014 bgcolor=#E9E9E9
| 538014 ||  || — || October 20, 2006 || Mount Lemmon || Mount Lemmon Survey ||  || align=right | 1.1 km || 
|-id=015 bgcolor=#d6d6d6
| 538015 ||  || — || November 18, 2003 || Kitt Peak || Spacewatch ||  || align=right | 3.0 km || 
|-id=016 bgcolor=#d6d6d6
| 538016 ||  || — || October 20, 2003 || Kitt Peak || Spacewatch ||  || align=right | 3.0 km || 
|-id=017 bgcolor=#fefefe
| 538017 ||  || — || January 8, 2016 || Haleakala || Pan-STARRS ||  || align=right data-sort-value="0.69" | 690 m || 
|-id=018 bgcolor=#E9E9E9
| 538018 ||  || — || March 30, 2012 || Siding Spring || SSS ||  || align=right | 2.8 km || 
|-id=019 bgcolor=#d6d6d6
| 538019 ||  || — || September 24, 2008 || Mount Lemmon || Mount Lemmon Survey ||  || align=right | 3.1 km || 
|-id=020 bgcolor=#fefefe
| 538020 ||  || — || August 31, 2014 || Haleakala || Pan-STARRS ||  || align=right data-sort-value="0.72" | 720 m || 
|-id=021 bgcolor=#fefefe
| 538021 ||  || — || September 4, 2011 || Haleakala || Pan-STARRS ||  || align=right data-sort-value="0.60" | 600 m || 
|-id=022 bgcolor=#E9E9E9
| 538022 ||  || — || February 14, 2012 || Haleakala || Pan-STARRS ||  || align=right | 1.6 km || 
|-id=023 bgcolor=#fefefe
| 538023 ||  || — || November 22, 2011 || Mount Lemmon || Mount Lemmon Survey ||  || align=right data-sort-value="0.64" | 640 m || 
|-id=024 bgcolor=#fefefe
| 538024 ||  || — || July 30, 2014 || Haleakala || Pan-STARRS ||  || align=right data-sort-value="0.71" | 710 m || 
|-id=025 bgcolor=#fefefe
| 538025 ||  || — || November 23, 2008 || Kitt Peak || Spacewatch ||  || align=right data-sort-value="0.69" | 690 m || 
|-id=026 bgcolor=#fefefe
| 538026 ||  || — || February 2, 2005 || Kitt Peak || Spacewatch ||  || align=right data-sort-value="0.81" | 810 m || 
|-id=027 bgcolor=#fefefe
| 538027 ||  || — || February 5, 2009 || Kitt Peak || Spacewatch ||  || align=right data-sort-value="0.51" | 510 m || 
|-id=028 bgcolor=#fefefe
| 538028 ||  || — || April 10, 2013 || Haleakala || Pan-STARRS ||  || align=right data-sort-value="0.64" | 640 m || 
|-id=029 bgcolor=#E9E9E9
| 538029 ||  || — || January 3, 2016 || Haleakala || Pan-STARRS ||  || align=right | 1.6 km || 
|-id=030 bgcolor=#E9E9E9
| 538030 ||  || — || November 22, 2014 || Haleakala || Pan-STARRS ||  || align=right | 1.3 km || 
|-id=031 bgcolor=#fefefe
| 538031 ||  || — || July 28, 2014 || Haleakala || Pan-STARRS ||  || align=right data-sort-value="0.60" | 600 m || 
|-id=032 bgcolor=#E9E9E9
| 538032 ||  || — || January 4, 2016 || Haleakala || Pan-STARRS ||  || align=right | 1.8 km || 
|-id=033 bgcolor=#fefefe
| 538033 ||  || — || January 1, 2009 || Kitt Peak || Spacewatch ||  || align=right data-sort-value="0.67" | 670 m || 
|-id=034 bgcolor=#E9E9E9
| 538034 ||  || — || June 18, 2013 || Haleakala || Pan-STARRS ||  || align=right | 1.5 km || 
|-id=035 bgcolor=#E9E9E9
| 538035 ||  || — || January 20, 2012 || Haleakala || Pan-STARRS ||  || align=right | 1.9 km || 
|-id=036 bgcolor=#fefefe
| 538036 ||  || — || March 16, 2013 || Kitt Peak || Spacewatch ||  || align=right data-sort-value="0.57" | 570 m || 
|-id=037 bgcolor=#E9E9E9
| 538037 ||  || — || September 30, 2005 || Catalina || CSS ||  || align=right | 1.7 km || 
|-id=038 bgcolor=#E9E9E9
| 538038 ||  || — || March 25, 2012 || Mount Lemmon || Mount Lemmon Survey ||  || align=right | 1.3 km || 
|-id=039 bgcolor=#E9E9E9
| 538039 ||  || — || July 7, 2013 || Siding Spring || SSS ||  || align=right | 1.7 km || 
|-id=040 bgcolor=#E9E9E9
| 538040 ||  || — || November 4, 2010 || Mount Lemmon || Mount Lemmon Survey ||  || align=right | 1.0 km || 
|-id=041 bgcolor=#fefefe
| 538041 ||  || — || September 27, 2011 || Mount Lemmon || Mount Lemmon Survey ||  || align=right data-sort-value="0.56" | 560 m || 
|-id=042 bgcolor=#fefefe
| 538042 ||  || — || January 1, 2012 || Mount Lemmon || Mount Lemmon Survey ||  || align=right data-sort-value="0.82" | 820 m || 
|-id=043 bgcolor=#E9E9E9
| 538043 ||  || — || November 6, 2010 || Kitt Peak || Spacewatch ||  || align=right data-sort-value="0.89" | 890 m || 
|-id=044 bgcolor=#E9E9E9
| 538044 ||  || — || January 16, 2008 || Mount Lemmon || Mount Lemmon Survey ||  || align=right | 1.2 km || 
|-id=045 bgcolor=#fefefe
| 538045 ||  || — || January 14, 2012 || Mount Lemmon || Mount Lemmon Survey ||  || align=right data-sort-value="0.72" | 720 m || 
|-id=046 bgcolor=#E9E9E9
| 538046 ||  || — || July 13, 2013 || Haleakala || Pan-STARRS ||  || align=right data-sort-value="0.97" | 970 m || 
|-id=047 bgcolor=#fefefe
| 538047 ||  || — || September 2, 2014 || Haleakala || Pan-STARRS ||  || align=right data-sort-value="0.76" | 760 m || 
|-id=048 bgcolor=#E9E9E9
| 538048 ||  || — || November 1, 2010 || Mount Lemmon || Mount Lemmon Survey ||  || align=right data-sort-value="0.92" | 920 m || 
|-id=049 bgcolor=#E9E9E9
| 538049 ||  || — || July 14, 2013 || Haleakala || Pan-STARRS ||  || align=right | 1.3 km || 
|-id=050 bgcolor=#E9E9E9
| 538050 ||  || — || November 27, 2014 || Haleakala || Pan-STARRS ||  || align=right | 1.3 km || 
|-id=051 bgcolor=#E9E9E9
| 538051 ||  || — || November 1, 2010 || Mount Lemmon || Mount Lemmon Survey ||  || align=right data-sort-value="0.89" | 890 m || 
|-id=052 bgcolor=#E9E9E9
| 538052 ||  || — || March 16, 2012 || Haleakala || Pan-STARRS ||  || align=right | 1.1 km || 
|-id=053 bgcolor=#fefefe
| 538053 ||  || — || August 19, 2014 || Haleakala || Pan-STARRS ||  || align=right data-sort-value="0.87" | 870 m || 
|-id=054 bgcolor=#E9E9E9
| 538054 ||  || — || September 16, 2009 || Kitt Peak || Spacewatch ||  || align=right | 2.0 km || 
|-id=055 bgcolor=#fefefe
| 538055 ||  || — || April 30, 2006 || Kitt Peak || Spacewatch ||  || align=right data-sort-value="0.67" | 670 m || 
|-id=056 bgcolor=#E9E9E9
| 538056 ||  || — || January 9, 2016 || Haleakala || Pan-STARRS ||  || align=right | 1.7 km || 
|-id=057 bgcolor=#d6d6d6
| 538057 ||  || — || November 6, 2008 || Kitt Peak || Spacewatch ||  || align=right | 3.0 km || 
|-id=058 bgcolor=#d6d6d6
| 538058 ||  || — || November 21, 2008 || Kitt Peak || Spacewatch ||  || align=right | 3.5 km || 
|-id=059 bgcolor=#E9E9E9
| 538059 ||  || — || January 11, 2011 || Mount Lemmon || Mount Lemmon Survey ||  || align=right | 1.9 km || 
|-id=060 bgcolor=#d6d6d6
| 538060 ||  || — || November 1, 2013 || Kitt Peak || Spacewatch ||  || align=right | 3.2 km || 
|-id=061 bgcolor=#d6d6d6
| 538061 ||  || — || October 26, 2008 || Kitt Peak || Spacewatch ||  || align=right | 4.0 km || 
|-id=062 bgcolor=#d6d6d6
| 538062 ||  || — || October 3, 2013 || Catalina || CSS ||  || align=right | 3.5 km || 
|-id=063 bgcolor=#E9E9E9
| 538063 ||  || — || January 20, 2012 || Haleakala || Pan-STARRS ||  || align=right | 1.8 km || 
|-id=064 bgcolor=#E9E9E9
| 538064 ||  || — || October 17, 2010 || Catalina || CSS ||  || align=right data-sort-value="0.98" | 980 m || 
|-id=065 bgcolor=#E9E9E9
| 538065 ||  || — || March 13, 2012 || Mount Lemmon || Mount Lemmon Survey ||  || align=right data-sort-value="0.96" | 960 m || 
|-id=066 bgcolor=#E9E9E9
| 538066 ||  || — || January 12, 2016 || Haleakala || Pan-STARRS ||  || align=right | 1.9 km || 
|-id=067 bgcolor=#fefefe
| 538067 ||  || — || October 22, 2011 || Kitt Peak || Spacewatch ||  || align=right data-sort-value="0.57" | 570 m || 
|-id=068 bgcolor=#fefefe
| 538068 ||  || — || October 26, 2011 || Haleakala || Pan-STARRS ||  || align=right data-sort-value="0.60" | 600 m || 
|-id=069 bgcolor=#E9E9E9
| 538069 ||  || — || January 13, 2016 || Haleakala || Pan-STARRS ||  || align=right | 1.4 km || 
|-id=070 bgcolor=#fefefe
| 538070 ||  || — || August 28, 2014 || Haleakala || Pan-STARRS ||  || align=right data-sort-value="0.74" | 740 m || 
|-id=071 bgcolor=#fefefe
| 538071 ||  || — || December 29, 2011 || Mount Lemmon || Mount Lemmon Survey ||  || align=right data-sort-value="0.90" | 900 m || 
|-id=072 bgcolor=#E9E9E9
| 538072 ||  || — || March 16, 2012 || Mount Lemmon || Mount Lemmon Survey ||  || align=right data-sort-value="0.86" | 860 m || 
|-id=073 bgcolor=#fefefe
| 538073 ||  || — || April 13, 2013 || Haleakala || Pan-STARRS ||  || align=right data-sort-value="0.73" | 730 m || 
|-id=074 bgcolor=#E9E9E9
| 538074 ||  || — || February 8, 2008 || Mount Lemmon || Mount Lemmon Survey ||  || align=right | 1.3 km || 
|-id=075 bgcolor=#E9E9E9
| 538075 ||  || — || November 22, 2014 || Haleakala || Pan-STARRS ||  || align=right | 1.3 km || 
|-id=076 bgcolor=#E9E9E9
| 538076 ||  || — || January 17, 2011 || Mount Lemmon || Mount Lemmon Survey ||  || align=right | 2.1 km || 
|-id=077 bgcolor=#d6d6d6
| 538077 ||  || — || January 7, 2010 || Kitt Peak || Spacewatch ||  || align=right | 2.9 km || 
|-id=078 bgcolor=#fefefe
| 538078 ||  || — || November 17, 2014 || Haleakala || Pan-STARRS ||  || align=right data-sort-value="0.94" | 940 m || 
|-id=079 bgcolor=#E9E9E9
| 538079 ||  || — || February 23, 2012 || Mount Lemmon || Mount Lemmon Survey ||  || align=right data-sort-value="0.85" | 850 m || 
|-id=080 bgcolor=#E9E9E9
| 538080 ||  || — || November 13, 2010 || Kitt Peak || Spacewatch ||  || align=right | 2.3 km || 
|-id=081 bgcolor=#fefefe
| 538081 ||  || — || January 1, 2008 || Kitt Peak || Spacewatch ||  || align=right data-sort-value="0.80" | 800 m || 
|-id=082 bgcolor=#fefefe
| 538082 ||  || — || January 9, 2016 || Haleakala || Pan-STARRS ||  || align=right data-sort-value="0.72" | 720 m || 
|-id=083 bgcolor=#fefefe
| 538083 ||  || — || January 9, 2016 || Haleakala || Pan-STARRS || H || align=right data-sort-value="0.56" | 560 m || 
|-id=084 bgcolor=#fefefe
| 538084 ||  || — || March 28, 2011 || Catalina || CSS || H || align=right data-sort-value="0.88" | 880 m || 
|-id=085 bgcolor=#FFC2E0
| 538085 ||  || — || January 8, 2016 || Haleakala || Pan-STARRS || APO +1km || align=right | 1.0 km || 
|-id=086 bgcolor=#fefefe
| 538086 ||  || — || February 12, 1999 || Socorro || LINEAR ||  || align=right | 1.1 km || 
|-id=087 bgcolor=#d6d6d6
| 538087 ||  || — || September 22, 2008 || Kitt Peak || Spacewatch ||  || align=right | 3.3 km || 
|-id=088 bgcolor=#E9E9E9
| 538088 ||  || — || November 30, 2005 || Kitt Peak || Spacewatch ||  || align=right | 2.2 km || 
|-id=089 bgcolor=#fefefe
| 538089 ||  || — || November 25, 2011 || Haleakala || Pan-STARRS ||  || align=right data-sort-value="0.73" | 730 m || 
|-id=090 bgcolor=#E9E9E9
| 538090 ||  || — || January 8, 2016 || Haleakala || Pan-STARRS ||  || align=right | 1.5 km || 
|-id=091 bgcolor=#E9E9E9
| 538091 ||  || — || March 31, 2012 || Mount Lemmon || Mount Lemmon Survey ||  || align=right | 1.4 km || 
|-id=092 bgcolor=#fefefe
| 538092 ||  || — || December 22, 2012 || Haleakala || Pan-STARRS || H || align=right data-sort-value="0.71" | 710 m || 
|-id=093 bgcolor=#fefefe
| 538093 ||  || — || January 17, 2009 || Kitt Peak || Spacewatch ||  || align=right data-sort-value="0.67" | 670 m || 
|-id=094 bgcolor=#fefefe
| 538094 ||  || — || May 26, 2006 || Kitt Peak || Spacewatch ||  || align=right data-sort-value="0.74" | 740 m || 
|-id=095 bgcolor=#fefefe
| 538095 ||  || — || November 20, 2008 || Mount Lemmon || Mount Lemmon Survey ||  || align=right data-sort-value="0.73" | 730 m || 
|-id=096 bgcolor=#fefefe
| 538096 ||  || — || January 7, 2006 || Mount Lemmon || Mount Lemmon Survey ||  || align=right data-sort-value="0.73" | 730 m || 
|-id=097 bgcolor=#E9E9E9
| 538097 ||  || — || January 10, 2007 || Mount Lemmon || Mount Lemmon Survey ||  || align=right | 2.2 km || 
|-id=098 bgcolor=#fefefe
| 538098 ||  || — || September 25, 2011 || Haleakala || Pan-STARRS ||  || align=right data-sort-value="0.60" | 600 m || 
|-id=099 bgcolor=#E9E9E9
| 538099 ||  || — || August 23, 2014 || Haleakala || Pan-STARRS ||  || align=right | 1.2 km || 
|-id=100 bgcolor=#fefefe
| 538100 ||  || — || October 20, 2011 || Kitt Peak || Spacewatch ||  || align=right data-sort-value="0.73" | 730 m || 
|}

538101–538200 

|-bgcolor=#fefefe
| 538101 ||  || — || April 13, 2013 || Haleakala || Pan-STARRS ||  || align=right data-sort-value="0.62" | 620 m || 
|-id=102 bgcolor=#fefefe
| 538102 ||  || — || January 11, 2008 || Kitt Peak || Spacewatch || H || align=right data-sort-value="0.56" | 560 m || 
|-id=103 bgcolor=#fefefe
| 538103 ||  || — || December 31, 2011 || Kitt Peak || Spacewatch ||  || align=right data-sort-value="0.85" | 850 m || 
|-id=104 bgcolor=#fefefe
| 538104 ||  || — || January 14, 2016 || Haleakala || Pan-STARRS ||  || align=right data-sort-value="0.64" | 640 m || 
|-id=105 bgcolor=#E9E9E9
| 538105 ||  || — || February 13, 2008 || Kitt Peak || Spacewatch ||  || align=right | 1.0 km || 
|-id=106 bgcolor=#fefefe
| 538106 ||  || — || November 15, 2011 || Mount Lemmon || Mount Lemmon Survey ||  || align=right data-sort-value="0.54" | 540 m || 
|-id=107 bgcolor=#fefefe
| 538107 ||  || — || March 24, 2006 || Kitt Peak || Spacewatch ||  || align=right data-sort-value="0.61" | 610 m || 
|-id=108 bgcolor=#fefefe
| 538108 ||  || — || September 13, 2007 || Kitt Peak || Spacewatch ||  || align=right data-sort-value="0.73" | 730 m || 
|-id=109 bgcolor=#fefefe
| 538109 ||  || — || July 7, 2014 || Haleakala || Pan-STARRS ||  || align=right data-sort-value="0.69" | 690 m || 
|-id=110 bgcolor=#fefefe
| 538110 ||  || — || October 23, 2011 || Mount Lemmon || Mount Lemmon Survey ||  || align=right data-sort-value="0.54" | 540 m || 
|-id=111 bgcolor=#fefefe
| 538111 ||  || — || November 2, 2007 || Kitt Peak || Spacewatch ||  || align=right data-sort-value="0.76" | 760 m || 
|-id=112 bgcolor=#fefefe
| 538112 ||  || — || February 3, 2009 || Mount Lemmon || Mount Lemmon Survey ||  || align=right data-sort-value="0.76" | 760 m || 
|-id=113 bgcolor=#E9E9E9
| 538113 ||  || — || February 13, 2012 || Haleakala || Pan-STARRS ||  || align=right | 1.1 km || 
|-id=114 bgcolor=#fefefe
| 538114 ||  || — || November 24, 2011 || Mount Lemmon || Mount Lemmon Survey ||  || align=right data-sort-value="0.99" | 990 m || 
|-id=115 bgcolor=#fefefe
| 538115 ||  || — || April 7, 2014 || Mount Lemmon || Mount Lemmon Survey || H || align=right data-sort-value="0.66" | 660 m || 
|-id=116 bgcolor=#fefefe
| 538116 ||  || — || December 9, 2004 || Kitt Peak || Spacewatch ||  || align=right data-sort-value="0.70" | 700 m || 
|-id=117 bgcolor=#E9E9E9
| 538117 ||  || — || January 10, 2008 || Mount Lemmon || Mount Lemmon Survey ||  || align=right data-sort-value="0.94" | 940 m || 
|-id=118 bgcolor=#fefefe
| 538118 ||  || — || December 20, 2004 || Mount Lemmon || Mount Lemmon Survey ||  || align=right data-sort-value="0.62" | 620 m || 
|-id=119 bgcolor=#fefefe
| 538119 ||  || — || December 19, 2004 || Mount Lemmon || Mount Lemmon Survey ||  || align=right | 1.0 km || 
|-id=120 bgcolor=#fefefe
| 538120 ||  || — || November 22, 2008 || Kitt Peak || Spacewatch ||  || align=right data-sort-value="0.65" | 650 m || 
|-id=121 bgcolor=#fefefe
| 538121 ||  || — || October 24, 2011 || Haleakala || Pan-STARRS ||  || align=right data-sort-value="0.88" | 880 m || 
|-id=122 bgcolor=#fefefe
| 538122 ||  || — || February 19, 2009 || Kitt Peak || Spacewatch ||  || align=right data-sort-value="0.66" | 660 m || 
|-id=123 bgcolor=#fefefe
| 538123 ||  || — || February 25, 2006 || Kitt Peak || Spacewatch ||  || align=right data-sort-value="0.55" | 550 m || 
|-id=124 bgcolor=#FA8072
| 538124 ||  || — || February 11, 2011 || Catalina || CSS || H || align=right data-sort-value="0.70" | 700 m || 
|-id=125 bgcolor=#fefefe
| 538125 ||  || — || September 18, 2003 || Kitt Peak || Spacewatch || H || align=right data-sort-value="0.69" | 690 m || 
|-id=126 bgcolor=#E9E9E9
| 538126 ||  || — || March 29, 2007 || Kitt Peak || Spacewatch ||  || align=right | 2.2 km || 
|-id=127 bgcolor=#d6d6d6
| 538127 ||  || — || May 24, 2001 || Kitt Peak || Spacewatch ||  || align=right | 3.1 km || 
|-id=128 bgcolor=#fefefe
| 538128 ||  || — || August 22, 2014 || Haleakala || Pan-STARRS ||  || align=right data-sort-value="0.79" | 790 m || 
|-id=129 bgcolor=#fefefe
| 538129 ||  || — || October 12, 2014 || Mount Lemmon || Mount Lemmon Survey ||  || align=right data-sort-value="0.64" | 640 m || 
|-id=130 bgcolor=#E9E9E9
| 538130 ||  || — || March 29, 2008 || Kitt Peak || Spacewatch ||  || align=right | 1.2 km || 
|-id=131 bgcolor=#E9E9E9
| 538131 ||  || — || May 21, 2012 || Haleakala || Pan-STARRS ||  || align=right | 1.9 km || 
|-id=132 bgcolor=#E9E9E9
| 538132 ||  || — || March 27, 2012 || Kitt Peak || Spacewatch ||  || align=right | 1.6 km || 
|-id=133 bgcolor=#fefefe
| 538133 ||  || — || January 4, 2012 || Mount Lemmon || Mount Lemmon Survey ||  || align=right data-sort-value="0.72" | 720 m || 
|-id=134 bgcolor=#fefefe
| 538134 ||  || — || November 22, 2011 || Mount Lemmon || Mount Lemmon Survey ||  || align=right data-sort-value="0.83" | 830 m || 
|-id=135 bgcolor=#d6d6d6
| 538135 ||  || — || December 15, 2014 || Mount Lemmon || Mount Lemmon Survey ||  || align=right | 2.4 km || 
|-id=136 bgcolor=#fefefe
| 538136 ||  || — || October 25, 2011 || Haleakala || Pan-STARRS ||  || align=right data-sort-value="0.60" | 600 m || 
|-id=137 bgcolor=#E9E9E9
| 538137 ||  || — || December 22, 2005 || Kitt Peak || Spacewatch ||  || align=right | 2.6 km || 
|-id=138 bgcolor=#fefefe
| 538138 ||  || — || November 16, 2011 || Mount Lemmon || Mount Lemmon Survey ||  || align=right data-sort-value="0.62" | 620 m || 
|-id=139 bgcolor=#E9E9E9
| 538139 ||  || — || February 10, 2007 || Mount Lemmon || Mount Lemmon Survey ||  || align=right | 1.8 km || 
|-id=140 bgcolor=#E9E9E9
| 538140 ||  || — || November 27, 2014 || Mount Lemmon || Mount Lemmon Survey ||  || align=right | 1.4 km || 
|-id=141 bgcolor=#E9E9E9
| 538141 ||  || — || January 30, 2011 || Haleakala || Pan-STARRS ||  || align=right | 2.0 km || 
|-id=142 bgcolor=#d6d6d6
| 538142 ||  || — || May 14, 2010 || WISE || WISE ||  || align=right | 3.4 km || 
|-id=143 bgcolor=#E9E9E9
| 538143 ||  || — || December 29, 2005 || Kitt Peak || Spacewatch ||  || align=right | 2.2 km || 
|-id=144 bgcolor=#E9E9E9
| 538144 ||  || — || January 26, 2011 || Kitt Peak || Spacewatch ||  || align=right | 1.7 km || 
|-id=145 bgcolor=#E9E9E9
| 538145 ||  || — || September 19, 1995 || Kitt Peak || Spacewatch ||  || align=right | 1.9 km || 
|-id=146 bgcolor=#E9E9E9
| 538146 ||  || — || September 1, 2013 || Haleakala || Pan-STARRS ||  || align=right | 1.7 km || 
|-id=147 bgcolor=#d6d6d6
| 538147 ||  || — || October 27, 2008 || Mount Lemmon || Mount Lemmon Survey ||  || align=right | 5.6 km || 
|-id=148 bgcolor=#E9E9E9
| 538148 ||  || — || October 29, 2010 || Kitt Peak || Spacewatch ||  || align=right | 1.1 km || 
|-id=149 bgcolor=#fefefe
| 538149 ||  || — || January 21, 2012 || Kitt Peak || Spacewatch ||  || align=right data-sort-value="0.67" | 670 m || 
|-id=150 bgcolor=#fefefe
| 538150 ||  || — || November 18, 2007 || Mount Lemmon || Mount Lemmon Survey ||  || align=right data-sort-value="0.85" | 850 m || 
|-id=151 bgcolor=#fefefe
| 538151 ||  || — || January 2, 2009 || Mount Lemmon || Mount Lemmon Survey ||  || align=right data-sort-value="0.63" | 630 m || 
|-id=152 bgcolor=#E9E9E9
| 538152 ||  || — || August 26, 2009 || Catalina || CSS ||  || align=right | 2.5 km || 
|-id=153 bgcolor=#fefefe
| 538153 ||  || — || February 20, 2009 || Mount Lemmon || Mount Lemmon Survey ||  || align=right data-sort-value="0.73" | 730 m || 
|-id=154 bgcolor=#E9E9E9
| 538154 ||  || — || April 1, 2008 || Mount Lemmon || Mount Lemmon Survey ||  || align=right data-sort-value="0.94" | 940 m || 
|-id=155 bgcolor=#fefefe
| 538155 ||  || — || April 16, 2005 || Kitt Peak || Spacewatch ||  || align=right data-sort-value="0.83" | 830 m || 
|-id=156 bgcolor=#fefefe
| 538156 ||  || — || September 25, 2014 || Mount Lemmon || Mount Lemmon Survey ||  || align=right data-sort-value="0.88" | 880 m || 
|-id=157 bgcolor=#fefefe
| 538157 ||  || — || April 1, 2009 || Kitt Peak || Spacewatch ||  || align=right data-sort-value="0.82" | 820 m || 
|-id=158 bgcolor=#d6d6d6
| 538158 ||  || — || January 17, 2016 || Haleakala || Pan-STARRS ||  || align=right | 2.3 km || 
|-id=159 bgcolor=#E9E9E9
| 538159 ||  || — || March 17, 2012 || Catalina || CSS ||  || align=right | 1.3 km || 
|-id=160 bgcolor=#fefefe
| 538160 ||  || — || January 30, 2012 || Mount Lemmon || Mount Lemmon Survey ||  || align=right data-sort-value="0.76" | 760 m || 
|-id=161 bgcolor=#fefefe
| 538161 ||  || — || January 16, 2016 || Haleakala || Pan-STARRS ||  || align=right data-sort-value="0.87" | 870 m || 
|-id=162 bgcolor=#fefefe
| 538162 ||  || — || January 17, 2016 || Haleakala || Pan-STARRS ||  || align=right data-sort-value="0.59" | 590 m || 
|-id=163 bgcolor=#E9E9E9
| 538163 ||  || — || February 10, 2008 || Kitt Peak || Spacewatch ||  || align=right data-sort-value="0.88" | 880 m || 
|-id=164 bgcolor=#E9E9E9
| 538164 ||  || — || January 30, 2011 || Mount Lemmon || Mount Lemmon Survey ||  || align=right | 2.1 km || 
|-id=165 bgcolor=#E9E9E9
| 538165 ||  || — || March 17, 2012 || Kitt Peak || Spacewatch ||  || align=right | 1.6 km || 
|-id=166 bgcolor=#d6d6d6
| 538166 ||  || — || December 29, 2014 || Haleakala || Pan-STARRS ||  || align=right | 2.7 km || 
|-id=167 bgcolor=#E9E9E9
| 538167 ||  || — || March 27, 2012 || Kitt Peak || Spacewatch ||  || align=right data-sort-value="0.91" | 910 m || 
|-id=168 bgcolor=#d6d6d6
| 538168 ||  || — || April 13, 2011 || Mount Lemmon || Mount Lemmon Survey ||  || align=right | 3.1 km || 
|-id=169 bgcolor=#E9E9E9
| 538169 ||  || — || July 14, 2013 || Haleakala || Pan-STARRS ||  || align=right | 2.8 km || 
|-id=170 bgcolor=#E9E9E9
| 538170 ||  || — || December 9, 2010 || Mount Lemmon || Mount Lemmon Survey ||  || align=right | 1.4 km || 
|-id=171 bgcolor=#E9E9E9
| 538171 ||  || — || September 10, 2013 || Haleakala || Pan-STARRS ||  || align=right | 1.0 km || 
|-id=172 bgcolor=#E9E9E9
| 538172 ||  || — || January 17, 2015 || Haleakala || Pan-STARRS ||  || align=right | 1.3 km || 
|-id=173 bgcolor=#d6d6d6
| 538173 ||  || — || November 3, 2014 || Mount Lemmon || Mount Lemmon Survey ||  || align=right | 3.1 km || 
|-id=174 bgcolor=#fefefe
| 538174 ||  || — || February 16, 2012 || Haleakala || Pan-STARRS ||  || align=right data-sort-value="0.68" | 680 m || 
|-id=175 bgcolor=#E9E9E9
| 538175 ||  || — || March 30, 2012 || Mount Lemmon || Mount Lemmon Survey ||  || align=right data-sort-value="0.85" | 850 m || 
|-id=176 bgcolor=#fefefe
| 538176 ||  || — || February 3, 2012 || Haleakala || Pan-STARRS ||  || align=right data-sort-value="0.61" | 610 m || 
|-id=177 bgcolor=#E9E9E9
| 538177 ||  || — || September 2, 2014 || Haleakala || Pan-STARRS ||  || align=right | 1.1 km || 
|-id=178 bgcolor=#fefefe
| 538178 ||  || — || April 1, 2009 || Kitt Peak || Spacewatch ||  || align=right data-sort-value="0.86" | 860 m || 
|-id=179 bgcolor=#E9E9E9
| 538179 ||  || — || January 29, 2016 || Mount Lemmon || Mount Lemmon Survey ||  || align=right | 2.4 km || 
|-id=180 bgcolor=#fefefe
| 538180 ||  || — || February 27, 2009 || Kitt Peak || Spacewatch ||  || align=right data-sort-value="0.65" | 650 m || 
|-id=181 bgcolor=#fefefe
| 538181 ||  || — || February 26, 2009 || Catalina || CSS ||  || align=right data-sort-value="0.71" | 710 m || 
|-id=182 bgcolor=#fefefe
| 538182 ||  || — || January 31, 2009 || Mount Lemmon || Mount Lemmon Survey ||  || align=right data-sort-value="0.55" | 550 m || 
|-id=183 bgcolor=#fefefe
| 538183 ||  || — || September 29, 2011 || Mount Lemmon || Mount Lemmon Survey ||  || align=right data-sort-value="0.54" | 540 m || 
|-id=184 bgcolor=#E9E9E9
| 538184 ||  || — || March 15, 2012 || Catalina || CSS ||  || align=right | 1.4 km || 
|-id=185 bgcolor=#fefefe
| 538185 ||  || — || March 10, 2005 || Mount Lemmon || Mount Lemmon Survey ||  || align=right data-sort-value="0.73" | 730 m || 
|-id=186 bgcolor=#fefefe
| 538186 ||  || — || August 30, 2014 || Kitt Peak || Spacewatch ||  || align=right data-sort-value="0.74" | 740 m || 
|-id=187 bgcolor=#fefefe
| 538187 ||  || — || March 17, 2005 || Kitt Peak || Spacewatch ||  || align=right data-sort-value="0.70" | 700 m || 
|-id=188 bgcolor=#E9E9E9
| 538188 ||  || — || November 1, 2010 || Mount Lemmon || Mount Lemmon Survey ||  || align=right data-sort-value="0.85" | 850 m || 
|-id=189 bgcolor=#E9E9E9
| 538189 ||  || — || January 28, 2007 || Mount Lemmon || Mount Lemmon Survey ||  || align=right | 2.9 km || 
|-id=190 bgcolor=#fefefe
| 538190 ||  || — || April 13, 2013 || Haleakala || Pan-STARRS ||  || align=right data-sort-value="0.68" | 680 m || 
|-id=191 bgcolor=#E9E9E9
| 538191 ||  || — || September 19, 2006 || Catalina || CSS ||  || align=right | 1.4 km || 
|-id=192 bgcolor=#d6d6d6
| 538192 ||  || — || February 1, 2006 || Kitt Peak || Spacewatch ||  || align=right | 3.0 km || 
|-id=193 bgcolor=#fefefe
| 538193 ||  || — || May 8, 2005 || Mount Lemmon || Mount Lemmon Survey ||  || align=right | 1.1 km || 
|-id=194 bgcolor=#fefefe
| 538194 ||  || — || December 22, 2012 || Haleakala || Pan-STARRS || H || align=right data-sort-value="0.53" | 530 m || 
|-id=195 bgcolor=#fefefe
| 538195 ||  || — || June 28, 2014 || Haleakala || Pan-STARRS ||  || align=right data-sort-value="0.54" | 540 m || 
|-id=196 bgcolor=#fefefe
| 538196 ||  || — || August 3, 2014 || Haleakala || Pan-STARRS ||  || align=right data-sort-value="0.50" | 500 m || 
|-id=197 bgcolor=#E9E9E9
| 538197 ||  || — || September 20, 2009 || Kitt Peak || Spacewatch ||  || align=right | 2.1 km || 
|-id=198 bgcolor=#fefefe
| 538198 ||  || — || February 14, 2013 || Haleakala || Pan-STARRS ||  || align=right data-sort-value="0.69" | 690 m || 
|-id=199 bgcolor=#fefefe
| 538199 ||  || — || December 29, 2008 || Kitt Peak || Spacewatch ||  || align=right data-sort-value="0.53" | 530 m || 
|-id=200 bgcolor=#fefefe
| 538200 ||  || — || January 30, 2009 || Mount Lemmon || Mount Lemmon Survey ||  || align=right data-sort-value="0.57" | 570 m || 
|}

538201–538300 

|-bgcolor=#fefefe
| 538201 ||  || — || February 2, 2009 || Kitt Peak || Spacewatch ||  || align=right data-sort-value="0.58" | 580 m || 
|-id=202 bgcolor=#fefefe
| 538202 ||  || — || October 18, 2007 || Kitt Peak || Spacewatch ||  || align=right data-sort-value="0.73" | 730 m || 
|-id=203 bgcolor=#fefefe
| 538203 ||  || — || October 20, 2011 || Kitt Peak || Spacewatch ||  || align=right data-sort-value="0.65" | 650 m || 
|-id=204 bgcolor=#E9E9E9
| 538204 ||  || — || September 12, 2005 || Kitt Peak || Spacewatch ||  || align=right | 2.1 km || 
|-id=205 bgcolor=#fefefe
| 538205 ||  || — || December 31, 2008 || Mount Lemmon || Mount Lemmon Survey ||  || align=right data-sort-value="0.51" | 510 m || 
|-id=206 bgcolor=#fefefe
| 538206 ||  || — || December 27, 2011 || Mount Lemmon || Mount Lemmon Survey ||  || align=right | 1.0 km || 
|-id=207 bgcolor=#fefefe
| 538207 ||  || — || June 27, 2014 || Haleakala || Pan-STARRS || H || align=right data-sort-value="0.71" | 710 m || 
|-id=208 bgcolor=#E9E9E9
| 538208 ||  || — || July 10, 2005 || Kitt Peak || Spacewatch ||  || align=right data-sort-value="0.94" | 940 m || 
|-id=209 bgcolor=#fefefe
| 538209 ||  || — || May 8, 2006 || Mount Lemmon || Mount Lemmon Survey ||  || align=right data-sort-value="0.76" | 760 m || 
|-id=210 bgcolor=#fefefe
| 538210 ||  || — || August 22, 2014 || Haleakala || Pan-STARRS ||  || align=right data-sort-value="0.57" | 570 m || 
|-id=211 bgcolor=#E9E9E9
| 538211 ||  || — || June 18, 2013 || Haleakala || Pan-STARRS ||  || align=right | 1.7 km || 
|-id=212 bgcolor=#FFC2E0
| 538212 ||  || — || February 6, 2016 || Catalina || CSS || APOPHA || align=right data-sort-value="0.65" | 650 m || 
|-id=213 bgcolor=#d6d6d6
| 538213 ||  || — || March 11, 2011 || Mount Lemmon || Mount Lemmon Survey ||  || align=right | 2.5 km || 
|-id=214 bgcolor=#fefefe
| 538214 ||  || — || September 29, 2011 || Mount Lemmon || Mount Lemmon Survey ||  || align=right data-sort-value="0.56" | 560 m || 
|-id=215 bgcolor=#fefefe
| 538215 ||  || — || December 8, 2015 || Haleakala || Pan-STARRS || H || align=right data-sort-value="0.72" | 720 m || 
|-id=216 bgcolor=#fefefe
| 538216 ||  || — || March 9, 2005 || Mount Lemmon || Mount Lemmon Survey ||  || align=right data-sort-value="0.79" | 790 m || 
|-id=217 bgcolor=#fefefe
| 538217 ||  || — || February 1, 2012 || Kitt Peak || Spacewatch ||  || align=right data-sort-value="0.76" | 760 m || 
|-id=218 bgcolor=#fefefe
| 538218 ||  || — || March 3, 2005 || Kitt Peak || Spacewatch ||  || align=right data-sort-value="0.96" | 960 m || 
|-id=219 bgcolor=#E9E9E9
| 538219 ||  || — || August 27, 2009 || Kitt Peak || Spacewatch ||  || align=right | 1.3 km || 
|-id=220 bgcolor=#fefefe
| 538220 ||  || — || February 3, 2009 || Mount Lemmon || Mount Lemmon Survey ||  || align=right data-sort-value="0.59" | 590 m || 
|-id=221 bgcolor=#E9E9E9
| 538221 ||  || — || November 14, 2006 || Kitt Peak || Spacewatch ||  || align=right data-sort-value="0.82" | 820 m || 
|-id=222 bgcolor=#fefefe
| 538222 ||  || — || September 6, 1996 || Kitt Peak || Spacewatch ||  || align=right data-sort-value="0.90" | 900 m || 
|-id=223 bgcolor=#fefefe
| 538223 ||  || — || December 7, 1996 || Kitt Peak || Spacewatch || V || align=right data-sort-value="0.69" | 690 m || 
|-id=224 bgcolor=#fefefe
| 538224 ||  || — || September 12, 2007 || Catalina || CSS ||  || align=right data-sort-value="0.87" | 870 m || 
|-id=225 bgcolor=#E9E9E9
| 538225 ||  || — || April 13, 2012 || Haleakala || Pan-STARRS ||  || align=right | 2.2 km || 
|-id=226 bgcolor=#E9E9E9
| 538226 ||  || — || October 5, 2014 || Haleakala || Pan-STARRS ||  || align=right | 1.8 km || 
|-id=227 bgcolor=#FA8072
| 538227 ||  || — || May 10, 2014 || Haleakala || Pan-STARRS || H || align=right data-sort-value="0.63" | 630 m || 
|-id=228 bgcolor=#fefefe
| 538228 ||  || — || December 17, 2003 || Kitt Peak || Spacewatch ||  || align=right data-sort-value="0.93" | 930 m || 
|-id=229 bgcolor=#fefefe
| 538229 ||  || — || October 19, 2007 || Kitt Peak || Spacewatch ||  || align=right data-sort-value="0.66" | 660 m || 
|-id=230 bgcolor=#fefefe
| 538230 ||  || — || October 12, 2007 || Mount Lemmon || Mount Lemmon Survey ||  || align=right data-sort-value="0.58" | 580 m || 
|-id=231 bgcolor=#fefefe
| 538231 ||  || — || September 14, 2007 || Mount Lemmon || Mount Lemmon Survey ||  || align=right data-sort-value="0.76" | 760 m || 
|-id=232 bgcolor=#fefefe
| 538232 ||  || — || February 4, 2009 || Mount Lemmon || Mount Lemmon Survey ||  || align=right data-sort-value="0.50" | 500 m || 
|-id=233 bgcolor=#fefefe
| 538233 ||  || — || March 13, 2005 || Kitt Peak || Spacewatch ||  || align=right | 2.1 km || 
|-id=234 bgcolor=#fefefe
| 538234 ||  || — || March 14, 1999 || Kitt Peak || Spacewatch ||  || align=right data-sort-value="0.58" | 580 m || 
|-id=235 bgcolor=#fefefe
| 538235 ||  || — || July 7, 2014 || Haleakala || Pan-STARRS ||  || align=right data-sort-value="0.57" | 570 m || 
|-id=236 bgcolor=#fefefe
| 538236 ||  || — || January 18, 2008 || Mount Lemmon || Mount Lemmon Survey ||  || align=right data-sort-value="0.90" | 900 m || 
|-id=237 bgcolor=#fefefe
| 538237 ||  || — || May 9, 2013 || Haleakala || Pan-STARRS ||  || align=right data-sort-value="0.64" | 640 m || 
|-id=238 bgcolor=#E9E9E9
| 538238 ||  || — || April 16, 2012 || Haleakala || Pan-STARRS ||  || align=right | 1.9 km || 
|-id=239 bgcolor=#fefefe
| 538239 ||  || — || November 2, 2007 || Kitt Peak || Spacewatch ||  || align=right data-sort-value="0.64" | 640 m || 
|-id=240 bgcolor=#E9E9E9
| 538240 ||  || — || September 17, 1995 || Kitt Peak || Spacewatch || AGN || align=right | 1.2 km || 
|-id=241 bgcolor=#E9E9E9
| 538241 ||  || — || September 12, 2001 || Socorro || LINEAR ||  || align=right | 1.1 km || 
|-id=242 bgcolor=#E9E9E9
| 538242 ||  || — || February 25, 2012 || Mount Lemmon || Mount Lemmon Survey ||  || align=right | 1.7 km || 
|-id=243 bgcolor=#E9E9E9
| 538243 ||  || — || November 22, 2006 || Kitt Peak || Spacewatch ||  || align=right data-sort-value="0.98" | 980 m || 
|-id=244 bgcolor=#fefefe
| 538244 ||  || — || January 11, 2016 || Haleakala || Pan-STARRS || H || align=right data-sort-value="0.78" | 780 m || 
|-id=245 bgcolor=#E9E9E9
| 538245 ||  || — || February 26, 2008 || Kitt Peak || Spacewatch ||  || align=right | 1.0 km || 
|-id=246 bgcolor=#d6d6d6
| 538246 ||  || — || March 9, 2011 || Mount Lemmon || Mount Lemmon Survey || EOS || align=right | 2.8 km || 
|-id=247 bgcolor=#E9E9E9
| 538247 ||  || — || December 3, 2010 || Mount Lemmon || Mount Lemmon Survey ||  || align=right | 1.5 km || 
|-id=248 bgcolor=#E9E9E9
| 538248 ||  || — || February 13, 2008 || Mount Lemmon || Mount Lemmon Survey ||  || align=right | 1.1 km || 
|-id=249 bgcolor=#d6d6d6
| 538249 ||  || — || March 11, 2011 || Mount Lemmon || Mount Lemmon Survey ||  || align=right | 2.7 km || 
|-id=250 bgcolor=#E9E9E9
| 538250 ||  || — || November 26, 2014 || Haleakala || Pan-STARRS ||  || align=right | 1.1 km || 
|-id=251 bgcolor=#fefefe
| 538251 ||  || — || December 31, 2008 || Mount Lemmon || Mount Lemmon Survey ||  || align=right data-sort-value="0.62" | 620 m || 
|-id=252 bgcolor=#E9E9E9
| 538252 ||  || — || December 2, 2010 || Mount Lemmon || Mount Lemmon Survey ||  || align=right | 1.7 km || 
|-id=253 bgcolor=#fefefe
| 538253 ||  || — || August 26, 2014 || Haleakala || Pan-STARRS || H || align=right data-sort-value="0.54" | 540 m || 
|-id=254 bgcolor=#fefefe
| 538254 ||  || — || February 12, 2016 || Haleakala || Pan-STARRS || H || align=right data-sort-value="0.53" | 530 m || 
|-id=255 bgcolor=#fefefe
| 538255 ||  || — || January 18, 2012 || Catalina || CSS ||  || align=right | 1.0 km || 
|-id=256 bgcolor=#d6d6d6
| 538256 ||  || — || February 3, 2016 || Haleakala || Pan-STARRS ||  || align=right | 3.2 km || 
|-id=257 bgcolor=#E9E9E9
| 538257 ||  || — || February 10, 2016 || Haleakala || Pan-STARRS ||  || align=right | 1.9 km || 
|-id=258 bgcolor=#d6d6d6
| 538258 ||  || — || March 2, 2006 || Kitt Peak || Spacewatch ||  || align=right | 3.1 km || 
|-id=259 bgcolor=#E9E9E9
| 538259 ||  || — || January 26, 2010 || WISE || WISE ||  || align=right | 1.7 km || 
|-id=260 bgcolor=#fefefe
| 538260 ||  || — || November 2, 2007 || Mount Lemmon || Mount Lemmon Survey ||  || align=right data-sort-value="0.72" | 720 m || 
|-id=261 bgcolor=#fefefe
| 538261 ||  || — || September 23, 2014 || Mount Lemmon || Mount Lemmon Survey ||  || align=right data-sort-value="0.76" | 760 m || 
|-id=262 bgcolor=#fefefe
| 538262 ||  || — || April 4, 2005 || Catalina || CSS ||  || align=right data-sort-value="0.75" | 750 m || 
|-id=263 bgcolor=#fefefe
| 538263 ||  || — || February 3, 2012 || Haleakala || Pan-STARRS ||  || align=right data-sort-value="0.65" | 650 m || 
|-id=264 bgcolor=#d6d6d6
| 538264 ||  || — || March 8, 2005 || Mount Lemmon || Mount Lemmon Survey ||  || align=right | 3.1 km || 
|-id=265 bgcolor=#d6d6d6
| 538265 ||  || — || May 4, 2006 || Kitt Peak || Spacewatch ||  || align=right | 2.7 km || 
|-id=266 bgcolor=#d6d6d6
| 538266 ||  || — || November 2, 2008 || Mount Lemmon || Mount Lemmon Survey ||  || align=right | 2.7 km || 
|-id=267 bgcolor=#E9E9E9
| 538267 ||  || — || January 10, 2006 || Mount Lemmon || Mount Lemmon Survey ||  || align=right | 2.6 km || 
|-id=268 bgcolor=#E9E9E9
| 538268 ||  || — || March 1, 2012 || Mount Lemmon || Mount Lemmon Survey ||  || align=right | 1.4 km || 
|-id=269 bgcolor=#E9E9E9
| 538269 ||  || — || January 8, 2011 || Mount Lemmon || Mount Lemmon Survey ||  || align=right | 1.2 km || 
|-id=270 bgcolor=#fefefe
| 538270 ||  || — || February 27, 2009 || Kitt Peak || Spacewatch ||  || align=right data-sort-value="0.66" | 660 m || 
|-id=271 bgcolor=#E9E9E9
| 538271 ||  || — || March 11, 2007 || Mount Lemmon || Mount Lemmon Survey ||  || align=right | 1.4 km || 
|-id=272 bgcolor=#E9E9E9
| 538272 ||  || — || November 4, 2014 || Mount Lemmon || Mount Lemmon Survey ||  || align=right | 1.5 km || 
|-id=273 bgcolor=#E9E9E9
| 538273 ||  || — || November 8, 2010 || Mount Lemmon || Mount Lemmon Survey ||  || align=right data-sort-value="0.72" | 720 m || 
|-id=274 bgcolor=#E9E9E9
| 538274 ||  || — || November 1, 2005 || Mount Lemmon || Mount Lemmon Survey ||  || align=right | 1.6 km || 
|-id=275 bgcolor=#E9E9E9
| 538275 ||  || — || November 1, 2005 || Mount Lemmon || Mount Lemmon Survey ||  || align=right | 2.0 km || 
|-id=276 bgcolor=#E9E9E9
| 538276 ||  || — || October 25, 2005 || Catalina || CSS ||  || align=right | 1.6 km || 
|-id=277 bgcolor=#fefefe
| 538277 ||  || — || February 1, 2006 || Mount Lemmon || Mount Lemmon Survey ||  || align=right data-sort-value="0.52" | 520 m || 
|-id=278 bgcolor=#E9E9E9
| 538278 ||  || — || June 1, 2012 || Mount Lemmon || Mount Lemmon Survey ||  || align=right | 2.7 km || 
|-id=279 bgcolor=#d6d6d6
| 538279 ||  || — || May 25, 2006 || Mount Lemmon || Mount Lemmon Survey ||  || align=right | 2.8 km || 
|-id=280 bgcolor=#E9E9E9
| 538280 ||  || — || January 25, 2006 || Kitt Peak || Spacewatch ||  || align=right | 2.2 km || 
|-id=281 bgcolor=#d6d6d6
| 538281 ||  || — || September 26, 2006 || Mount Lemmon || Mount Lemmon Survey ||  || align=right | 2.8 km || 
|-id=282 bgcolor=#d6d6d6
| 538282 ||  || — || October 15, 2013 || Mount Lemmon || Mount Lemmon Survey ||  || align=right | 3.6 km || 
|-id=283 bgcolor=#E9E9E9
| 538283 ||  || — || January 28, 2007 || Mount Lemmon || Mount Lemmon Survey ||  || align=right | 1.4 km || 
|-id=284 bgcolor=#E9E9E9
| 538284 ||  || — || September 27, 2009 || Mount Lemmon || Mount Lemmon Survey ||  || align=right | 1.3 km || 
|-id=285 bgcolor=#E9E9E9
| 538285 ||  || — || December 25, 2005 || Kitt Peak || Spacewatch ||  || align=right | 2.4 km || 
|-id=286 bgcolor=#E9E9E9
| 538286 ||  || — || October 27, 2009 || Mount Lemmon || Mount Lemmon Survey ||  || align=right | 1.5 km || 
|-id=287 bgcolor=#E9E9E9
| 538287 ||  || — || November 14, 2014 || Kitt Peak || Spacewatch ||  || align=right data-sort-value="0.94" | 940 m || 
|-id=288 bgcolor=#E9E9E9
| 538288 ||  || — || November 18, 2006 || Mount Lemmon || Mount Lemmon Survey ||  || align=right | 1.3 km || 
|-id=289 bgcolor=#fefefe
| 538289 ||  || — || October 29, 2003 || Kitt Peak || Spacewatch ||  || align=right data-sort-value="0.76" | 760 m || 
|-id=290 bgcolor=#fefefe
| 538290 ||  || — || September 14, 2007 || Mount Lemmon || Mount Lemmon Survey ||  || align=right data-sort-value="0.63" | 630 m || 
|-id=291 bgcolor=#E9E9E9
| 538291 ||  || — || March 10, 2007 || Mount Lemmon || Mount Lemmon Survey ||  || align=right | 1.8 km || 
|-id=292 bgcolor=#d6d6d6
| 538292 ||  || — || February 17, 2010 || Mount Lemmon || Mount Lemmon Survey ||  || align=right | 3.9 km || 
|-id=293 bgcolor=#E9E9E9
| 538293 ||  || — || October 11, 1999 || Kitt Peak || Spacewatch ||  || align=right | 2.4 km || 
|-id=294 bgcolor=#fefefe
| 538294 ||  || — || November 16, 2011 || Kitt Peak || Spacewatch ||  || align=right data-sort-value="0.75" | 750 m || 
|-id=295 bgcolor=#E9E9E9
| 538295 ||  || — || May 19, 2012 || Mount Lemmon || Mount Lemmon Survey ||  || align=right | 2.1 km || 
|-id=296 bgcolor=#d6d6d6
| 538296 ||  || — || June 4, 2010 || WISE || WISE ||  || align=right | 3.2 km || 
|-id=297 bgcolor=#d6d6d6
| 538297 ||  || — || November 27, 2013 || Haleakala || Pan-STARRS ||  || align=right | 3.2 km || 
|-id=298 bgcolor=#d6d6d6
| 538298 ||  || — || October 7, 2007 || Mount Lemmon || Mount Lemmon Survey ||  || align=right | 2.6 km || 
|-id=299 bgcolor=#d6d6d6
| 538299 ||  || — || February 14, 2016 || Haleakala || Pan-STARRS ||  || align=right | 3.0 km || 
|-id=300 bgcolor=#d6d6d6
| 538300 ||  || — || November 4, 2007 || Mount Lemmon || Mount Lemmon Survey ||  || align=right | 3.6 km || 
|}

538301–538400 

|-bgcolor=#fefefe
| 538301 ||  || — || January 21, 2012 || Haleakala || Pan-STARRS ||  || align=right data-sort-value="0.97" | 970 m || 
|-id=302 bgcolor=#E9E9E9
| 538302 ||  || — || March 16, 2012 || Mount Lemmon || Mount Lemmon Survey ||  || align=right | 1.0 km || 
|-id=303 bgcolor=#E9E9E9
| 538303 ||  || — || March 22, 2012 || Mount Lemmon || Mount Lemmon Survey ||  || align=right | 1.3 km || 
|-id=304 bgcolor=#E9E9E9
| 538304 ||  || — || April 14, 2008 || Mount Lemmon || Mount Lemmon Survey ||  || align=right data-sort-value="0.88" | 880 m || 
|-id=305 bgcolor=#E9E9E9
| 538305 ||  || — || February 28, 2012 || Haleakala || Pan-STARRS ||  || align=right | 1.4 km || 
|-id=306 bgcolor=#E9E9E9
| 538306 ||  || — || November 28, 2014 || Haleakala || Pan-STARRS ||  || align=right data-sort-value="0.99" | 990 m || 
|-id=307 bgcolor=#d6d6d6
| 538307 ||  || — || December 24, 2014 || Mount Lemmon || Mount Lemmon Survey ||  || align=right | 3.2 km || 
|-id=308 bgcolor=#d6d6d6
| 538308 ||  || — || February 12, 2011 || Mount Lemmon || Mount Lemmon Survey ||  || align=right | 2.3 km || 
|-id=309 bgcolor=#d6d6d6
| 538309 ||  || — || September 26, 2013 || Catalina || CSS ||  || align=right | 3.3 km || 
|-id=310 bgcolor=#E9E9E9
| 538310 ||  || — || July 14, 2013 || Haleakala || Pan-STARRS ||  || align=right data-sort-value="0.90" | 900 m || 
|-id=311 bgcolor=#E9E9E9
| 538311 ||  || — || May 12, 2012 || Haleakala || Pan-STARRS ||  || align=right data-sort-value="0.98" | 980 m || 
|-id=312 bgcolor=#E9E9E9
| 538312 ||  || — || May 15, 2012 || Haleakala || Pan-STARRS ||  || align=right data-sort-value="0.82" | 820 m || 
|-id=313 bgcolor=#d6d6d6
| 538313 ||  || — || January 20, 2015 || Haleakala || Pan-STARRS ||  || align=right | 2.7 km || 
|-id=314 bgcolor=#d6d6d6
| 538314 ||  || — || November 6, 2013 || Catalina || CSS ||  || align=right | 3.0 km || 
|-id=315 bgcolor=#E9E9E9
| 538315 ||  || — || January 26, 2011 || Mount Lemmon || Mount Lemmon Survey ||  || align=right | 2.1 km || 
|-id=316 bgcolor=#E9E9E9
| 538316 ||  || — || February 28, 2012 || Haleakala || Pan-STARRS ||  || align=right data-sort-value="0.78" | 780 m || 
|-id=317 bgcolor=#E9E9E9
| 538317 ||  || — || January 30, 2011 || Haleakala || Pan-STARRS ||  || align=right | 1.9 km || 
|-id=318 bgcolor=#fefefe
| 538318 ||  || — || January 14, 2008 || Kitt Peak || Spacewatch ||  || align=right data-sort-value="0.73" | 730 m || 
|-id=319 bgcolor=#E9E9E9
| 538319 ||  || — || December 10, 2009 || Mount Lemmon || Mount Lemmon Survey ||  || align=right | 2.4 km || 
|-id=320 bgcolor=#E9E9E9
| 538320 ||  || — || November 18, 2009 || Mount Lemmon || Mount Lemmon Survey ||  || align=right | 2.5 km || 
|-id=321 bgcolor=#E9E9E9
| 538321 ||  || — || September 27, 2009 || Kitt Peak || Spacewatch ||  || align=right | 1.8 km || 
|-id=322 bgcolor=#E9E9E9
| 538322 ||  || — || August 15, 2013 || Haleakala || Pan-STARRS ||  || align=right | 1.1 km || 
|-id=323 bgcolor=#E9E9E9
| 538323 ||  || — || November 20, 2014 || Haleakala || Pan-STARRS ||  || align=right data-sort-value="0.94" | 940 m || 
|-id=324 bgcolor=#fefefe
| 538324 ||  || — || February 2, 2005 || Kitt Peak || Spacewatch ||  || align=right data-sort-value="0.73" | 730 m || 
|-id=325 bgcolor=#E9E9E9
| 538325 ||  || — || January 27, 2011 || Kitt Peak || Spacewatch ||  || align=right | 1.9 km || 
|-id=326 bgcolor=#fefefe
| 538326 ||  || — || April 17, 2009 || Kitt Peak || Spacewatch ||  || align=right data-sort-value="0.95" | 950 m || 
|-id=327 bgcolor=#E9E9E9
| 538327 ||  || — || June 1, 2003 || Kitt Peak || Spacewatch ||  || align=right | 2.6 km || 
|-id=328 bgcolor=#fefefe
| 538328 ||  || — || January 26, 2012 || Mount Lemmon || Mount Lemmon Survey ||  || align=right data-sort-value="0.65" | 650 m || 
|-id=329 bgcolor=#fefefe
| 538329 ||  || — || September 13, 2007 || Mount Lemmon || Mount Lemmon Survey ||  || align=right data-sort-value="0.87" | 870 m || 
|-id=330 bgcolor=#E9E9E9
| 538330 ||  || — || December 5, 2005 || Kitt Peak || Spacewatch ||  || align=right | 2.1 km || 
|-id=331 bgcolor=#E9E9E9
| 538331 ||  || — || February 13, 2011 || Mount Lemmon || Mount Lemmon Survey ||  || align=right | 2.0 km || 
|-id=332 bgcolor=#d6d6d6
| 538332 ||  || — || September 21, 2008 || Kitt Peak || Spacewatch ||  || align=right | 2.7 km || 
|-id=333 bgcolor=#d6d6d6
| 538333 ||  || — || September 28, 2003 || Kitt Peak || Spacewatch ||  || align=right | 2.4 km || 
|-id=334 bgcolor=#E9E9E9
| 538334 ||  || — || December 8, 2010 || Mount Lemmon || Mount Lemmon Survey ||  || align=right | 1.4 km || 
|-id=335 bgcolor=#fefefe
| 538335 ||  || — || January 19, 2012 || Haleakala || Pan-STARRS ||  || align=right data-sort-value="0.70" | 700 m || 
|-id=336 bgcolor=#E9E9E9
| 538336 ||  || — || October 27, 2014 || Haleakala || Pan-STARRS ||  || align=right | 1.5 km || 
|-id=337 bgcolor=#fefefe
| 538337 ||  || — || February 3, 2009 || Mount Lemmon || Mount Lemmon Survey ||  || align=right data-sort-value="0.82" | 820 m || 
|-id=338 bgcolor=#fefefe
| 538338 ||  || — || April 12, 2013 || Haleakala || Pan-STARRS ||  || align=right data-sort-value="0.73" | 730 m || 
|-id=339 bgcolor=#fefefe
| 538339 ||  || — || March 3, 2009 || Mount Lemmon || Mount Lemmon Survey ||  || align=right data-sort-value="0.67" | 670 m || 
|-id=340 bgcolor=#E9E9E9
| 538340 ||  || — || October 31, 2014 || Mount Lemmon || Mount Lemmon Survey ||  || align=right | 1.2 km || 
|-id=341 bgcolor=#d6d6d6
| 538341 ||  || — || February 14, 2010 || Mount Lemmon || Mount Lemmon Survey ||  || align=right | 2.7 km || 
|-id=342 bgcolor=#E9E9E9
| 538342 ||  || — || March 14, 2012 || Mount Lemmon || Mount Lemmon Survey ||  || align=right | 1.2 km || 
|-id=343 bgcolor=#E9E9E9
| 538343 ||  || — || March 8, 2008 || Mount Lemmon || Mount Lemmon Survey ||  || align=right | 1.1 km || 
|-id=344 bgcolor=#E9E9E9
| 538344 ||  || — || September 1, 2013 || Mount Lemmon || Mount Lemmon Survey ||  || align=right | 2.3 km || 
|-id=345 bgcolor=#fefefe
| 538345 ||  || — || September 23, 2014 || Mount Lemmon || Mount Lemmon Survey ||  || align=right data-sort-value="0.64" | 640 m || 
|-id=346 bgcolor=#E9E9E9
| 538346 ||  || — || January 15, 2015 || Haleakala || Pan-STARRS ||  || align=right data-sort-value="0.89" | 890 m || 
|-id=347 bgcolor=#E9E9E9
| 538347 ||  || — || February 1, 2008 || Mount Lemmon || Mount Lemmon Survey ||  || align=right data-sort-value="0.88" | 880 m || 
|-id=348 bgcolor=#fefefe
| 538348 ||  || — || March 12, 2005 || Kitt Peak || Spacewatch ||  || align=right data-sort-value="0.58" | 580 m || 
|-id=349 bgcolor=#fefefe
| 538349 ||  || — || September 3, 2014 || Mount Lemmon || Mount Lemmon Survey ||  || align=right data-sort-value="0.69" | 690 m || 
|-id=350 bgcolor=#E9E9E9
| 538350 ||  || — || November 25, 2005 || Kitt Peak || Spacewatch ||  || align=right | 2.7 km || 
|-id=351 bgcolor=#E9E9E9
| 538351 ||  || — || April 30, 2012 || Kitt Peak || Spacewatch ||  || align=right | 2.6 km || 
|-id=352 bgcolor=#E9E9E9
| 538352 ||  || — || April 4, 2008 || Mount Lemmon || Mount Lemmon Survey ||  || align=right | 1.1 km || 
|-id=353 bgcolor=#E9E9E9
| 538353 ||  || — || January 28, 2007 || Kitt Peak || Spacewatch ||  || align=right | 1.2 km || 
|-id=354 bgcolor=#E9E9E9
| 538354 ||  || — || September 27, 2005 || Kitt Peak || Spacewatch ||  || align=right | 1.1 km || 
|-id=355 bgcolor=#d6d6d6
| 538355 ||  || — || December 29, 2014 || Haleakala || Pan-STARRS ||  || align=right | 3.3 km || 
|-id=356 bgcolor=#E9E9E9
| 538356 ||  || — || September 5, 2010 || Mount Lemmon || Mount Lemmon Survey ||  || align=right data-sort-value="0.94" | 940 m || 
|-id=357 bgcolor=#E9E9E9
| 538357 ||  || — || August 29, 2009 || Kitt Peak || Spacewatch ||  || align=right | 1.3 km || 
|-id=358 bgcolor=#E9E9E9
| 538358 ||  || — || October 22, 2009 || Mount Lemmon || Mount Lemmon Survey ||  || align=right | 1.7 km || 
|-id=359 bgcolor=#d6d6d6
| 538359 ||  || — || August 14, 2013 || Haleakala || Pan-STARRS ||  || align=right | 2.4 km || 
|-id=360 bgcolor=#E9E9E9
| 538360 ||  || — || July 13, 2013 || Haleakala || Pan-STARRS ||  || align=right | 1.3 km || 
|-id=361 bgcolor=#d6d6d6
| 538361 ||  || — || February 9, 2016 || Haleakala || Pan-STARRS ||  || align=right | 2.2 km || 
|-id=362 bgcolor=#E9E9E9
| 538362 ||  || — || March 30, 2012 || Kitt Peak || Spacewatch ||  || align=right data-sort-value="0.73" | 730 m || 
|-id=363 bgcolor=#E9E9E9
| 538363 ||  || — || November 30, 2010 || Mount Lemmon || Mount Lemmon Survey ||  || align=right | 1.1 km || 
|-id=364 bgcolor=#E9E9E9
| 538364 ||  || — || February 10, 2016 || Haleakala || Pan-STARRS ||  || align=right data-sort-value="0.79" | 790 m || 
|-id=365 bgcolor=#d6d6d6
| 538365 ||  || — || August 13, 2012 || Siding Spring || SSS ||  || align=right | 3.0 km || 
|-id=366 bgcolor=#E9E9E9
| 538366 ||  || — || November 26, 2014 || Haleakala || Pan-STARRS ||  || align=right | 1.7 km || 
|-id=367 bgcolor=#d6d6d6
| 538367 ||  || — || May 2, 2010 || WISE || WISE ||  || align=right | 2.7 km || 
|-id=368 bgcolor=#d6d6d6
| 538368 ||  || — || March 12, 2005 || Kitt Peak || Spacewatch ||  || align=right | 2.9 km || 
|-id=369 bgcolor=#fefefe
| 538369 ||  || — || October 25, 2014 || Mount Lemmon || Mount Lemmon Survey ||  || align=right data-sort-value="0.56" | 560 m || 
|-id=370 bgcolor=#E9E9E9
| 538370 ||  || — || January 29, 2011 || Kitt Peak || Spacewatch ||  || align=right | 2.3 km || 
|-id=371 bgcolor=#fefefe
| 538371 ||  || — || November 25, 2014 || Mount Lemmon || Mount Lemmon Survey ||  || align=right data-sort-value="0.79" | 790 m || 
|-id=372 bgcolor=#d6d6d6
| 538372 ||  || — || September 14, 2013 || Mount Lemmon || Mount Lemmon Survey ||  || align=right | 2.9 km || 
|-id=373 bgcolor=#d6d6d6
| 538373 ||  || — || April 7, 2011 || Kitt Peak || Spacewatch ||  || align=right | 3.2 km || 
|-id=374 bgcolor=#fefefe
| 538374 ||  || — || November 3, 2007 || Kitt Peak || Spacewatch ||  || align=right data-sort-value="0.62" | 620 m || 
|-id=375 bgcolor=#fefefe
| 538375 ||  || — || February 11, 2016 || Haleakala || Pan-STARRS ||  || align=right data-sort-value="0.81" | 810 m || 
|-id=376 bgcolor=#E9E9E9
| 538376 ||  || — || August 31, 2005 || Kitt Peak || Spacewatch ||  || align=right | 1.0 km || 
|-id=377 bgcolor=#fefefe
| 538377 ||  || — || December 18, 2007 || Kitt Peak || Spacewatch ||  || align=right data-sort-value="0.72" | 720 m || 
|-id=378 bgcolor=#E9E9E9
| 538378 ||  || — || December 21, 2006 || Kitt Peak || Spacewatch ||  || align=right data-sort-value="0.87" | 870 m || 
|-id=379 bgcolor=#d6d6d6
| 538379 ||  || — || May 31, 2011 || Kitt Peak || Spacewatch ||  || align=right | 2.9 km || 
|-id=380 bgcolor=#d6d6d6
| 538380 ||  || — || January 25, 2015 || Haleakala || Pan-STARRS ||  || align=right | 2.4 km || 
|-id=381 bgcolor=#E9E9E9
| 538381 ||  || — || May 21, 2012 || Mount Lemmon || Mount Lemmon Survey ||  || align=right | 1.8 km || 
|-id=382 bgcolor=#d6d6d6
| 538382 ||  || — || January 30, 2011 || Haleakala || Pan-STARRS ||  || align=right | 3.2 km || 
|-id=383 bgcolor=#E9E9E9
| 538383 ||  || — || July 16, 2013 || Haleakala || Pan-STARRS ||  || align=right | 1.5 km || 
|-id=384 bgcolor=#d6d6d6
| 538384 ||  || — || January 17, 2015 || Mount Lemmon || Mount Lemmon Survey ||  || align=right | 2.9 km || 
|-id=385 bgcolor=#fefefe
| 538385 ||  || — || February 11, 2016 || Haleakala || Pan-STARRS ||  || align=right data-sort-value="0.61" | 610 m || 
|-id=386 bgcolor=#d6d6d6
| 538386 ||  || — || February 18, 2010 || Mount Lemmon || Mount Lemmon Survey ||  || align=right | 2.9 km || 
|-id=387 bgcolor=#E9E9E9
| 538387 ||  || — || November 16, 2014 || Mount Lemmon || Mount Lemmon Survey ||  || align=right | 2.8 km || 
|-id=388 bgcolor=#E9E9E9
| 538388 ||  || — || February 13, 2016 || Haleakala || Pan-STARRS ||  || align=right | 2.6 km || 
|-id=389 bgcolor=#d6d6d6
| 538389 ||  || — || August 13, 2012 || Haleakala || Pan-STARRS ||  || align=right | 3.5 km || 
|-id=390 bgcolor=#E9E9E9
| 538390 ||  || — || November 12, 2014 || Haleakala || Pan-STARRS ||  || align=right data-sort-value="0.92" | 920 m || 
|-id=391 bgcolor=#d6d6d6
| 538391 ||  || — || February 14, 2016 || Haleakala || Pan-STARRS ||  || align=right | 3.2 km || 
|-id=392 bgcolor=#E9E9E9
| 538392 ||  || — || December 10, 2005 || Kitt Peak || Spacewatch ||  || align=right | 2.4 km || 
|-id=393 bgcolor=#fefefe
| 538393 ||  || — || May 23, 2011 || Mount Lemmon || Mount Lemmon Survey || H || align=right data-sort-value="0.64" | 640 m || 
|-id=394 bgcolor=#fefefe
| 538394 ||  || — || February 2, 2005 || Kitt Peak || Spacewatch ||  || align=right data-sort-value="0.69" | 690 m || 
|-id=395 bgcolor=#E9E9E9
| 538395 ||  || — || August 15, 2009 || Kitt Peak || Spacewatch ||  || align=right | 1.4 km || 
|-id=396 bgcolor=#E9E9E9
| 538396 ||  || — || March 24, 2003 || Kitt Peak || Spacewatch ||  || align=right | 1.5 km || 
|-id=397 bgcolor=#E9E9E9
| 538397 ||  || — || October 1, 2005 || Catalina || CSS ||  || align=right | 2.0 km || 
|-id=398 bgcolor=#fefefe
| 538398 ||  || — || November 15, 1999 || Socorro || LINEAR ||  || align=right data-sort-value="0.87" | 870 m || 
|-id=399 bgcolor=#fefefe
| 538399 ||  || — || January 22, 2006 || Mount Lemmon || Mount Lemmon Survey ||  || align=right data-sort-value="0.54" | 540 m || 
|-id=400 bgcolor=#d6d6d6
| 538400 ||  || — || March 9, 2000 || Kitt Peak || Spacewatch ||  || align=right | 3.1 km || 
|}

538401–538500 

|-bgcolor=#fefefe
| 538401 ||  || — || March 4, 2005 || Kitt Peak || Spacewatch ||  || align=right data-sort-value="0.82" | 820 m || 
|-id=402 bgcolor=#E9E9E9
| 538402 ||  || — || February 27, 2012 || Haleakala || Pan-STARRS ||  || align=right data-sort-value="0.90" | 900 m || 
|-id=403 bgcolor=#E9E9E9
| 538403 ||  || — || October 16, 2001 || Kitt Peak || Spacewatch ||  || align=right | 1.2 km || 
|-id=404 bgcolor=#E9E9E9
| 538404 ||  || — || February 27, 2012 || Kitt Peak || Spacewatch ||  || align=right | 1.6 km || 
|-id=405 bgcolor=#fefefe
| 538405 ||  || — || January 23, 2006 || Kitt Peak || Spacewatch ||  || align=right data-sort-value="0.62" | 620 m || 
|-id=406 bgcolor=#fefefe
| 538406 ||  || — || August 22, 2014 || Haleakala || Pan-STARRS ||  || align=right data-sort-value="0.77" | 770 m || 
|-id=407 bgcolor=#fefefe
| 538407 ||  || — || February 20, 2009 || Kitt Peak || Spacewatch ||  || align=right data-sort-value="0.82" | 820 m || 
|-id=408 bgcolor=#fefefe
| 538408 ||  || — || November 28, 2012 || Haleakala || Pan-STARRS || H || align=right data-sort-value="0.65" | 650 m || 
|-id=409 bgcolor=#d6d6d6
| 538409 ||  || — || September 28, 2013 || Mount Lemmon || Mount Lemmon Survey ||  || align=right | 3.6 km || 
|-id=410 bgcolor=#E9E9E9
| 538410 ||  || — || March 4, 2012 || Mount Lemmon || Mount Lemmon Survey ||  || align=right | 1.5 km || 
|-id=411 bgcolor=#E9E9E9
| 538411 ||  || — || February 13, 2007 || Mount Lemmon || Mount Lemmon Survey ||  || align=right | 1.4 km || 
|-id=412 bgcolor=#fefefe
| 538412 ||  || — || February 22, 2012 || Kitt Peak || Spacewatch ||  || align=right data-sort-value="0.62" | 620 m || 
|-id=413 bgcolor=#fefefe
| 538413 ||  || — || July 14, 2013 || Haleakala || Pan-STARRS ||  || align=right data-sort-value="0.75" | 750 m || 
|-id=414 bgcolor=#E9E9E9
| 538414 ||  || — || January 30, 2011 || Haleakala || Pan-STARRS ||  || align=right | 2.1 km || 
|-id=415 bgcolor=#E9E9E9
| 538415 ||  || — || September 20, 2009 || Kitt Peak || Spacewatch ||  || align=right | 1.3 km || 
|-id=416 bgcolor=#fefefe
| 538416 ||  || — || October 23, 2011 || Haleakala || Pan-STARRS ||  || align=right data-sort-value="0.56" | 560 m || 
|-id=417 bgcolor=#fefefe
| 538417 ||  || — || January 30, 2012 || Kitt Peak || Spacewatch ||  || align=right data-sort-value="0.66" | 660 m || 
|-id=418 bgcolor=#d6d6d6
| 538418 ||  || — || April 27, 2011 || Kitt Peak || Spacewatch ||  || align=right | 3.2 km || 
|-id=419 bgcolor=#fefefe
| 538419 ||  || — || October 26, 2008 || Mount Lemmon || Mount Lemmon Survey ||  || align=right data-sort-value="0.83" | 830 m || 
|-id=420 bgcolor=#E9E9E9
| 538420 ||  || — || January 18, 2010 || WISE || WISE ||  || align=right | 1.9 km || 
|-id=421 bgcolor=#fefefe
| 538421 ||  || — || January 5, 2012 || Kitt Peak || Spacewatch ||  || align=right data-sort-value="0.80" | 800 m || 
|-id=422 bgcolor=#d6d6d6
| 538422 ||  || — || July 13, 2013 || Haleakala || Pan-STARRS ||  || align=right | 3.3 km || 
|-id=423 bgcolor=#E9E9E9
| 538423 ||  || — || December 2, 2005 || Mount Lemmon || Mount Lemmon Survey ||  || align=right | 2.1 km || 
|-id=424 bgcolor=#fefefe
| 538424 ||  || — || May 8, 2013 || Haleakala || Pan-STARRS ||  || align=right data-sort-value="0.73" | 730 m || 
|-id=425 bgcolor=#fefefe
| 538425 ||  || — || October 18, 2009 || Catalina || CSS || H || align=right data-sort-value="0.62" | 620 m || 
|-id=426 bgcolor=#E9E9E9
| 538426 ||  || — || November 14, 1998 || Kitt Peak || Spacewatch ||  || align=right data-sort-value="0.74" | 740 m || 
|-id=427 bgcolor=#fefefe
| 538427 ||  || — || January 18, 2016 || Haleakala || Pan-STARRS || H || align=right data-sort-value="0.70" | 700 m || 
|-id=428 bgcolor=#E9E9E9
| 538428 ||  || — || January 17, 2007 || Catalina || CSS ||  || align=right | 1.8 km || 
|-id=429 bgcolor=#E9E9E9
| 538429 ||  || — || March 5, 2008 || Mount Lemmon || Mount Lemmon Survey ||  || align=right | 1.4 km || 
|-id=430 bgcolor=#d6d6d6
| 538430 ||  || — || December 18, 2009 || Mount Lemmon || Mount Lemmon Survey ||  || align=right | 3.4 km || 
|-id=431 bgcolor=#fefefe
| 538431 ||  || — || November 21, 2008 || Mount Lemmon || Mount Lemmon Survey ||  || align=right data-sort-value="0.73" | 730 m || 
|-id=432 bgcolor=#fefefe
| 538432 ||  || — || January 13, 2005 || Kitt Peak || Spacewatch ||  || align=right data-sort-value="0.59" | 590 m || 
|-id=433 bgcolor=#fefefe
| 538433 ||  || — || October 19, 2000 || Kitt Peak || Spacewatch ||  || align=right data-sort-value="0.67" | 670 m || 
|-id=434 bgcolor=#E9E9E9
| 538434 ||  || — || September 20, 2014 || Haleakala || Pan-STARRS ||  || align=right data-sort-value="0.83" | 830 m || 
|-id=435 bgcolor=#E9E9E9
| 538435 ||  || — || August 12, 2013 || Haleakala || Pan-STARRS ||  || align=right | 2.0 km || 
|-id=436 bgcolor=#E9E9E9
| 538436 ||  || — || January 28, 2011 || Kitt Peak || Spacewatch ||  || align=right | 1.9 km || 
|-id=437 bgcolor=#E9E9E9
| 538437 ||  || — || April 25, 2007 || Mount Lemmon || Mount Lemmon Survey ||  || align=right | 2.1 km || 
|-id=438 bgcolor=#E9E9E9
| 538438 ||  || — || April 15, 2012 || Haleakala || Pan-STARRS ||  || align=right | 1.7 km || 
|-id=439 bgcolor=#fefefe
| 538439 ||  || — || August 23, 2014 || Haleakala || Pan-STARRS ||  || align=right data-sort-value="0.66" | 660 m || 
|-id=440 bgcolor=#E9E9E9
| 538440 ||  || — || November 23, 2014 || Haleakala || Pan-STARRS ||  || align=right | 1.2 km || 
|-id=441 bgcolor=#E9E9E9
| 538441 ||  || — || January 13, 2016 || Haleakala || Pan-STARRS ||  || align=right | 1.1 km || 
|-id=442 bgcolor=#d6d6d6
| 538442 ||  || — || March 27, 2011 || Mount Lemmon || Mount Lemmon Survey ||  || align=right | 2.7 km || 
|-id=443 bgcolor=#E9E9E9
| 538443 ||  || — || March 22, 2012 || Mount Lemmon || Mount Lemmon Survey || EUN || align=right | 1.2 km || 
|-id=444 bgcolor=#fefefe
| 538444 ||  || — || March 8, 2008 || Kitt Peak || Spacewatch || H || align=right data-sort-value="0.47" | 470 m || 
|-id=445 bgcolor=#fefefe
| 538445 ||  || — || September 19, 2014 || Haleakala || Pan-STARRS ||  || align=right data-sort-value="0.57" | 570 m || 
|-id=446 bgcolor=#fefefe
| 538446 ||  || — || December 29, 2011 || Mount Lemmon || Mount Lemmon Survey ||  || align=right data-sort-value="0.74" | 740 m || 
|-id=447 bgcolor=#fefefe
| 538447 ||  || — || November 18, 2011 || Mount Lemmon || Mount Lemmon Survey || ERI || align=right | 1.4 km || 
|-id=448 bgcolor=#E9E9E9
| 538448 ||  || — || April 15, 2012 || Haleakala || Pan-STARRS ||  || align=right | 1.1 km || 
|-id=449 bgcolor=#fefefe
| 538449 ||  || — || January 5, 2006 || Mount Lemmon || Mount Lemmon Survey ||  || align=right data-sort-value="0.44" | 440 m || 
|-id=450 bgcolor=#fefefe
| 538450 ||  || — || March 4, 2005 || Catalina || CSS ||  || align=right data-sort-value="0.67" | 670 m || 
|-id=451 bgcolor=#E9E9E9
| 538451 ||  || — || August 9, 2013 || Haleakala || Pan-STARRS || WIT || align=right data-sort-value="0.85" | 850 m || 
|-id=452 bgcolor=#E9E9E9
| 538452 ||  || — || September 30, 2005 || Mount Lemmon || Mount Lemmon Survey || EUN || align=right | 1.4 km || 
|-id=453 bgcolor=#d6d6d6
| 538453 ||  || — || April 1, 2011 || Haleakala || Pan-STARRS || EOS || align=right | 1.6 km || 
|-id=454 bgcolor=#E9E9E9
| 538454 ||  || — || January 27, 2007 || Mount Lemmon || Mount Lemmon Survey ||  || align=right | 1.3 km || 
|-id=455 bgcolor=#E9E9E9
| 538455 ||  || — || July 15, 2013 || Haleakala || Pan-STARRS ||  || align=right data-sort-value="0.94" | 940 m || 
|-id=456 bgcolor=#E9E9E9
| 538456 ||  || — || September 28, 2009 || Mount Lemmon || Mount Lemmon Survey ||  || align=right | 1.5 km || 
|-id=457 bgcolor=#E9E9E9
| 538457 ||  || — || April 1, 2012 || Mount Lemmon || Mount Lemmon Survey ||  || align=right data-sort-value="0.94" | 940 m || 
|-id=458 bgcolor=#fefefe
| 538458 ||  || — || January 18, 2016 || Haleakala || Pan-STARRS ||  || align=right data-sort-value="0.68" | 680 m || 
|-id=459 bgcolor=#d6d6d6
| 538459 ||  || — || October 6, 2008 || Kitt Peak || Spacewatch ||  || align=right | 2.0 km || 
|-id=460 bgcolor=#E9E9E9
| 538460 ||  || — || August 31, 2005 || Kitt Peak || Spacewatch ||  || align=right | 1.5 km || 
|-id=461 bgcolor=#E9E9E9
| 538461 ||  || — || February 23, 2012 || Mount Lemmon || Mount Lemmon Survey || EUN || align=right | 1.3 km || 
|-id=462 bgcolor=#fefefe
| 538462 ||  || — || January 8, 2016 || Haleakala || Pan-STARRS ||  || align=right data-sort-value="0.74" | 740 m || 
|-id=463 bgcolor=#E9E9E9
| 538463 ||  || — || March 26, 2007 || Kitt Peak || Spacewatch ||  || align=right | 2.0 km || 
|-id=464 bgcolor=#fefefe
| 538464 ||  || — || January 19, 2012 || Haleakala || Pan-STARRS ||  || align=right data-sort-value="0.69" | 690 m || 
|-id=465 bgcolor=#E9E9E9
| 538465 ||  || — || November 19, 2009 || Mount Lemmon || Mount Lemmon Survey ||  || align=right | 2.1 km || 
|-id=466 bgcolor=#fefefe
| 538466 ||  || — || January 10, 2008 || Kitt Peak || Spacewatch ||  || align=right data-sort-value="0.87" | 870 m || 
|-id=467 bgcolor=#E9E9E9
| 538467 ||  || — || May 8, 2008 || Kitt Peak || Spacewatch ||  || align=right data-sort-value="0.79" | 790 m || 
|-id=468 bgcolor=#E9E9E9
| 538468 ||  || — || November 10, 2010 || Kitt Peak || Spacewatch ||  || align=right data-sort-value="0.72" | 720 m || 
|-id=469 bgcolor=#E9E9E9
| 538469 ||  || — || May 12, 2012 || Mount Lemmon || Mount Lemmon Survey ||  || align=right | 1.2 km || 
|-id=470 bgcolor=#fefefe
| 538470 ||  || — || September 20, 2014 || Haleakala || Pan-STARRS ||  || align=right data-sort-value="0.59" | 590 m || 
|-id=471 bgcolor=#d6d6d6
| 538471 ||  || — || July 21, 2012 || Siding Spring || SSS ||  || align=right | 3.5 km || 
|-id=472 bgcolor=#fefefe
| 538472 ||  || — || December 26, 2011 || Mount Lemmon || Mount Lemmon Survey ||  || align=right data-sort-value="0.88" | 880 m || 
|-id=473 bgcolor=#E9E9E9
| 538473 ||  || — || October 2, 2009 || Mount Lemmon || Mount Lemmon Survey || EUN || align=right | 1.2 km || 
|-id=474 bgcolor=#d6d6d6
| 538474 ||  || — || March 30, 2011 || Mount Lemmon || Mount Lemmon Survey ||  || align=right | 2.4 km || 
|-id=475 bgcolor=#fefefe
| 538475 ||  || — || March 29, 2001 || Kitt Peak || Spacewatch ||  || align=right data-sort-value="0.56" | 560 m || 
|-id=476 bgcolor=#fefefe
| 538476 ||  || — || March 19, 2013 || Haleakala || Pan-STARRS ||  || align=right data-sort-value="0.46" | 460 m || 
|-id=477 bgcolor=#fefefe
| 538477 ||  || — || September 2, 2014 || Haleakala || Pan-STARRS ||  || align=right data-sort-value="0.69" | 690 m || 
|-id=478 bgcolor=#d6d6d6
| 538478 ||  || — || March 14, 2010 || Kitt Peak || Spacewatch ||  || align=right | 3.4 km || 
|-id=479 bgcolor=#E9E9E9
| 538479 ||  || — || March 24, 2003 || Kitt Peak || Spacewatch ||  || align=right | 1.5 km || 
|-id=480 bgcolor=#fefefe
| 538480 ||  || — || September 4, 2010 || Mount Lemmon || Mount Lemmon Survey ||  || align=right data-sort-value="0.55" | 550 m || 
|-id=481 bgcolor=#fefefe
| 538481 ||  || — || January 18, 2016 || Haleakala || Pan-STARRS ||  || align=right data-sort-value="0.56" | 560 m || 
|-id=482 bgcolor=#fefefe
| 538482 ||  || — || February 22, 2009 || Kitt Peak || Spacewatch ||  || align=right data-sort-value="0.74" | 740 m || 
|-id=483 bgcolor=#E9E9E9
| 538483 ||  || — || January 9, 2011 || Kitt Peak || Spacewatch ||  || align=right | 2.3 km || 
|-id=484 bgcolor=#fefefe
| 538484 ||  || — || September 23, 2014 || Mount Lemmon || Mount Lemmon Survey ||  || align=right data-sort-value="0.61" | 610 m || 
|-id=485 bgcolor=#d6d6d6
| 538485 ||  || — || February 14, 2010 || Mount Lemmon || Mount Lemmon Survey ||  || align=right | 2.3 km || 
|-id=486 bgcolor=#fefefe
| 538486 ||  || — || August 27, 2014 || Haleakala || Pan-STARRS ||  || align=right data-sort-value="0.72" | 720 m || 
|-id=487 bgcolor=#d6d6d6
| 538487 ||  || — || October 1, 2013 || Kitt Peak || Spacewatch || EOS || align=right | 1.7 km || 
|-id=488 bgcolor=#E9E9E9
| 538488 ||  || — || March 14, 2007 || Kitt Peak || Spacewatch ||  || align=right | 2.4 km || 
|-id=489 bgcolor=#E9E9E9
| 538489 ||  || — || September 23, 2009 || Mount Lemmon || Mount Lemmon Survey ||  || align=right | 1.9 km || 
|-id=490 bgcolor=#fefefe
| 538490 ||  || — || October 26, 2011 || Haleakala || Pan-STARRS ||  || align=right data-sort-value="0.46" | 460 m || 
|-id=491 bgcolor=#E9E9E9
| 538491 ||  || — || June 20, 2013 || Haleakala || Pan-STARRS ||  || align=right | 2.3 km || 
|-id=492 bgcolor=#E9E9E9
| 538492 ||  || — || August 13, 2008 || La Sagra || OAM Obs. ||  || align=right | 2.9 km || 
|-id=493 bgcolor=#E9E9E9
| 538493 ||  || — || March 21, 2012 || Mount Lemmon || Mount Lemmon Survey ||  || align=right | 1.4 km || 
|-id=494 bgcolor=#E9E9E9
| 538494 ||  || — || April 27, 2012 || Haleakala || Pan-STARRS ||  || align=right | 1.7 km || 
|-id=495 bgcolor=#C7FF8F
| 538495 ||  || — || November 24, 2011 || Haleakala || Pan-STARRS || centaur || align=right | 18 km || 
|-id=496 bgcolor=#fefefe
| 538496 ||  || — || March 31, 2009 || Mount Lemmon || Mount Lemmon Survey ||  || align=right data-sort-value="0.54" | 540 m || 
|-id=497 bgcolor=#fefefe
| 538497 ||  || — || February 28, 2009 || Kitt Peak || Spacewatch ||  || align=right data-sort-value="0.76" | 760 m || 
|-id=498 bgcolor=#E9E9E9
| 538498 ||  || — || October 30, 2014 || Kitt Peak || Spacewatch ||  || align=right | 1.3 km || 
|-id=499 bgcolor=#E9E9E9
| 538499 ||  || — || April 19, 2012 || Siding Spring || SSS ||  || align=right | 1.4 km || 
|-id=500 bgcolor=#fefefe
| 538500 ||  || — || March 12, 2005 || Mount Lemmon || Mount Lemmon Survey ||  || align=right data-sort-value="0.87" | 870 m || 
|}

538501–538600 

|-bgcolor=#fefefe
| 538501 ||  || — || October 26, 2012 || Haleakala || Pan-STARRS || H || align=right data-sort-value="0.63" | 630 m || 
|-id=502 bgcolor=#fefefe
| 538502 ||  || — || March 3, 2016 || Mount Lemmon || Mount Lemmon Survey || H || align=right data-sort-value="0.60" | 600 m || 
|-id=503 bgcolor=#fefefe
| 538503 ||  || — || April 4, 2005 || Catalina || CSS || H || align=right data-sort-value="0.68" | 680 m || 
|-id=504 bgcolor=#fefefe
| 538504 ||  || — || March 2, 2016 || Haleakala || Pan-STARRS || H || align=right data-sort-value="0.46" | 460 m || 
|-id=505 bgcolor=#E9E9E9
| 538505 ||  || — || March 3, 2016 || Haleakala || Pan-STARRS ||  || align=right | 1.6 km || 
|-id=506 bgcolor=#d6d6d6
| 538506 ||  || — || September 13, 2007 || Anderson Mesa || LONEOS ||  || align=right | 3.2 km || 
|-id=507 bgcolor=#d6d6d6
| 538507 ||  || — || March 5, 2016 || Haleakala || Pan-STARRS ||  || align=right | 2.9 km || 
|-id=508 bgcolor=#d6d6d6
| 538508 ||  || — || April 7, 2006 || Kitt Peak || Spacewatch ||  || align=right | 2.2 km || 
|-id=509 bgcolor=#d6d6d6
| 538509 ||  || — || October 4, 2013 || Catalina || CSS ||  || align=right | 2.8 km || 
|-id=510 bgcolor=#d6d6d6
| 538510 ||  || — || October 24, 2013 || Mount Lemmon || Mount Lemmon Survey ||  || align=right | 2.4 km || 
|-id=511 bgcolor=#d6d6d6
| 538511 ||  || — || March 11, 2005 || Mount Lemmon || Mount Lemmon Survey ||  || align=right | 2.7 km || 
|-id=512 bgcolor=#d6d6d6
| 538512 ||  || — || March 18, 2005 || Catalina || CSS ||  || align=right | 3.3 km || 
|-id=513 bgcolor=#d6d6d6
| 538513 ||  || — || October 7, 2007 || Kitt Peak || Spacewatch ||  || align=right | 2.9 km || 
|-id=514 bgcolor=#d6d6d6
| 538514 ||  || — || February 14, 2010 || Mount Lemmon || Mount Lemmon Survey ||  || align=right | 2.1 km || 
|-id=515 bgcolor=#fefefe
| 538515 ||  || — || February 26, 2012 || Haleakala || Pan-STARRS ||  || align=right data-sort-value="0.67" | 670 m || 
|-id=516 bgcolor=#fefefe
| 538516 ||  || — || March 11, 2005 || Mount Lemmon || Mount Lemmon Survey ||  || align=right data-sort-value="0.70" | 700 m || 
|-id=517 bgcolor=#d6d6d6
| 538517 ||  || — || September 10, 2007 || Kitt Peak || Spacewatch ||  || align=right | 2.9 km || 
|-id=518 bgcolor=#E9E9E9
| 538518 ||  || — || November 29, 2014 || Kitt Peak || Spacewatch ||  || align=right | 1.7 km || 
|-id=519 bgcolor=#E9E9E9
| 538519 ||  || — || April 28, 2008 || Kitt Peak || Spacewatch ||  || align=right | 1.8 km || 
|-id=520 bgcolor=#E9E9E9
| 538520 ||  || — || October 7, 2005 || Mount Lemmon || Mount Lemmon Survey ||  || align=right | 1.1 km || 
|-id=521 bgcolor=#E9E9E9
| 538521 ||  || — || November 25, 2005 || Mount Lemmon || Mount Lemmon Survey ||  || align=right | 1.1 km || 
|-id=522 bgcolor=#d6d6d6
| 538522 ||  || — || September 25, 2012 || Mount Lemmon || Mount Lemmon Survey ||  || align=right | 2.5 km || 
|-id=523 bgcolor=#E9E9E9
| 538523 ||  || — || January 30, 2011 || Haleakala || Pan-STARRS ||  || align=right | 1.4 km || 
|-id=524 bgcolor=#d6d6d6
| 538524 ||  || — || October 26, 2008 || Mount Lemmon || Mount Lemmon Survey ||  || align=right | 3.2 km || 
|-id=525 bgcolor=#E9E9E9
| 538525 ||  || — || February 5, 2006 || Mount Lemmon || Mount Lemmon Survey ||  || align=right | 2.0 km || 
|-id=526 bgcolor=#d6d6d6
| 538526 ||  || — || February 25, 2006 || Mount Lemmon || Mount Lemmon Survey ||  || align=right | 1.9 km || 
|-id=527 bgcolor=#E9E9E9
| 538527 ||  || — || March 10, 2016 || Haleakala || Pan-STARRS ||  || align=right | 1.9 km || 
|-id=528 bgcolor=#E9E9E9
| 538528 ||  || — || August 7, 2008 || Kitt Peak || Spacewatch ||  || align=right | 2.1 km || 
|-id=529 bgcolor=#E9E9E9
| 538529 ||  || — || March 20, 2007 || Mount Lemmon || Mount Lemmon Survey ||  || align=right | 1.9 km || 
|-id=530 bgcolor=#fefefe
| 538530 ||  || — || December 14, 2010 || Mount Lemmon || Mount Lemmon Survey ||  || align=right data-sort-value="0.87" | 870 m || 
|-id=531 bgcolor=#E9E9E9
| 538531 ||  || — || March 6, 2011 || Mount Lemmon || Mount Lemmon Survey ||  || align=right | 1.6 km || 
|-id=532 bgcolor=#E9E9E9
| 538532 ||  || — || February 5, 2011 || Haleakala || Pan-STARRS ||  || align=right | 1.9 km || 
|-id=533 bgcolor=#E9E9E9
| 538533 ||  || — || March 14, 2007 || Mount Lemmon || Mount Lemmon Survey ||  || align=right | 1.5 km || 
|-id=534 bgcolor=#fefefe
| 538534 ||  || — || January 10, 2008 || Mount Lemmon || Mount Lemmon Survey ||  || align=right | 1.0 km || 
|-id=535 bgcolor=#E9E9E9
| 538535 ||  || — || September 24, 2009 || Mount Lemmon || Mount Lemmon Survey ||  || align=right | 1.6 km || 
|-id=536 bgcolor=#fefefe
| 538536 ||  || — || January 18, 2008 || Mount Lemmon || Mount Lemmon Survey ||  || align=right data-sort-value="0.67" | 670 m || 
|-id=537 bgcolor=#E9E9E9
| 538537 ||  || — || February 13, 2007 || Mount Lemmon || Mount Lemmon Survey ||  || align=right | 1.1 km || 
|-id=538 bgcolor=#E9E9E9
| 538538 ||  || — || February 23, 2007 || Mount Lemmon || Mount Lemmon Survey ||  || align=right | 1.6 km || 
|-id=539 bgcolor=#E9E9E9
| 538539 ||  || — || February 10, 2007 || Mount Lemmon || Mount Lemmon Survey ||  || align=right | 1.5 km || 
|-id=540 bgcolor=#E9E9E9
| 538540 ||  || — || December 16, 2014 || Haleakala || Pan-STARRS ||  || align=right | 1.9 km || 
|-id=541 bgcolor=#fefefe
| 538541 ||  || — || October 13, 2014 || Mount Lemmon || Mount Lemmon Survey ||  || align=right data-sort-value="0.81" | 810 m || 
|-id=542 bgcolor=#d6d6d6
| 538542 ||  || — || April 29, 2010 || WISE || WISE ||  || align=right | 2.7 km || 
|-id=543 bgcolor=#d6d6d6
| 538543 ||  || — || December 6, 2008 || Kitt Peak || Spacewatch ||  || align=right | 3.0 km || 
|-id=544 bgcolor=#E9E9E9
| 538544 ||  || — || October 27, 2005 || Catalina || CSS ||  || align=right | 1.8 km || 
|-id=545 bgcolor=#d6d6d6
| 538545 ||  || — || August 16, 2012 || Siding Spring || SSS ||  || align=right | 3.8 km || 
|-id=546 bgcolor=#E9E9E9
| 538546 ||  || — || September 1, 2013 || Haleakala || Pan-STARRS ||  || align=right | 1.7 km || 
|-id=547 bgcolor=#E9E9E9
| 538547 ||  || — || October 24, 2009 || Kitt Peak || Spacewatch ||  || align=right | 1.8 km || 
|-id=548 bgcolor=#E9E9E9
| 538548 ||  || — || March 16, 2007 || Mount Lemmon || Mount Lemmon Survey ||  || align=right | 2.8 km || 
|-id=549 bgcolor=#d6d6d6
| 538549 ||  || — || October 20, 2007 || Mount Lemmon || Mount Lemmon Survey ||  || align=right | 2.7 km || 
|-id=550 bgcolor=#E9E9E9
| 538550 ||  || — || April 16, 2007 || Mount Lemmon || Mount Lemmon Survey ||  || align=right | 1.9 km || 
|-id=551 bgcolor=#d6d6d6
| 538551 ||  || — || October 16, 2007 || Mount Lemmon || Mount Lemmon Survey ||  || align=right | 2.7 km || 
|-id=552 bgcolor=#E9E9E9
| 538552 ||  || — || August 22, 2008 || Kitt Peak || Spacewatch ||  || align=right | 1.7 km || 
|-id=553 bgcolor=#d6d6d6
| 538553 ||  || — || October 24, 1998 || Kitt Peak || Spacewatch ||  || align=right | 3.2 km || 
|-id=554 bgcolor=#d6d6d6
| 538554 ||  || — || December 18, 2007 || Mount Lemmon || Mount Lemmon Survey ||  || align=right | 4.6 km || 
|-id=555 bgcolor=#d6d6d6
| 538555 ||  || — || December 21, 2014 || Haleakala || Pan-STARRS ||  || align=right | 2.3 km || 
|-id=556 bgcolor=#E9E9E9
| 538556 ||  || — || July 13, 2013 || Haleakala || Pan-STARRS ||  || align=right data-sort-value="0.64" | 640 m || 
|-id=557 bgcolor=#E9E9E9
| 538557 ||  || — || October 30, 2014 || Mount Lemmon || Mount Lemmon Survey ||  || align=right data-sort-value="0.77" | 770 m || 
|-id=558 bgcolor=#E9E9E9
| 538558 ||  || — || March 15, 2007 || Mount Lemmon || Mount Lemmon Survey ||  || align=right | 2.2 km || 
|-id=559 bgcolor=#fefefe
| 538559 ||  || — || March 10, 2016 || Haleakala || Pan-STARRS ||  || align=right data-sort-value="0.63" | 630 m || 
|-id=560 bgcolor=#fefefe
| 538560 ||  || — || July 14, 2013 || Haleakala || Pan-STARRS ||  || align=right | 1.0 km || 
|-id=561 bgcolor=#E9E9E9
| 538561 ||  || — || November 10, 2009 || Kitt Peak || Spacewatch ||  || align=right | 3.6 km || 
|-id=562 bgcolor=#E9E9E9
| 538562 ||  || — || April 29, 2008 || Mount Lemmon || Mount Lemmon Survey ||  || align=right data-sort-value="0.91" | 910 m || 
|-id=563 bgcolor=#d6d6d6
| 538563 ||  || — || September 7, 2008 || Mount Lemmon || Mount Lemmon Survey ||  || align=right | 1.9 km || 
|-id=564 bgcolor=#d6d6d6
| 538564 ||  || — || May 5, 2010 || WISE || WISE ||  || align=right | 2.3 km || 
|-id=565 bgcolor=#d6d6d6
| 538565 ||  || — || March 11, 2016 || Haleakala || Pan-STARRS ||  || align=right | 1.9 km || 
|-id=566 bgcolor=#E9E9E9
| 538566 ||  || — || October 18, 2009 || Mount Lemmon || Mount Lemmon Survey ||  || align=right | 1.6 km || 
|-id=567 bgcolor=#E9E9E9
| 538567 ||  || — || November 7, 2010 || Mount Lemmon || Mount Lemmon Survey ||  || align=right data-sort-value="0.92" | 920 m || 
|-id=568 bgcolor=#E9E9E9
| 538568 ||  || — || August 12, 2013 || Haleakala || Pan-STARRS ||  || align=right | 1.2 km || 
|-id=569 bgcolor=#E9E9E9
| 538569 ||  || — || April 27, 2012 || Haleakala || Pan-STARRS ||  || align=right | 1.1 km || 
|-id=570 bgcolor=#E9E9E9
| 538570 ||  || — || November 8, 2009 || Mount Lemmon || Mount Lemmon Survey ||  || align=right | 2.2 km || 
|-id=571 bgcolor=#E9E9E9
| 538571 ||  || — || February 5, 2011 || Haleakala || Pan-STARRS ||  || align=right | 1.7 km || 
|-id=572 bgcolor=#E9E9E9
| 538572 ||  || — || April 7, 2007 || Mount Lemmon || Mount Lemmon Survey ||  || align=right | 1.9 km || 
|-id=573 bgcolor=#d6d6d6
| 538573 ||  || — || September 4, 2007 || Mount Lemmon || Mount Lemmon Survey ||  || align=right | 2.3 km || 
|-id=574 bgcolor=#E9E9E9
| 538574 ||  || — || October 30, 2013 || Haleakala || Pan-STARRS ||  || align=right | 2.3 km || 
|-id=575 bgcolor=#E9E9E9
| 538575 ||  || — || January 30, 2011 || Haleakala || Pan-STARRS ||  || align=right | 1.7 km || 
|-id=576 bgcolor=#E9E9E9
| 538576 ||  || — || June 18, 2013 || Haleakala || Pan-STARRS ||  || align=right data-sort-value="0.90" | 900 m || 
|-id=577 bgcolor=#E9E9E9
| 538577 ||  || — || March 2, 2011 || Kitt Peak || Spacewatch ||  || align=right | 2.4 km || 
|-id=578 bgcolor=#E9E9E9
| 538578 ||  || — || January 30, 2011 || Haleakala || Pan-STARRS ||  || align=right | 1.4 km || 
|-id=579 bgcolor=#d6d6d6
| 538579 ||  || — || September 9, 2007 || Kitt Peak || Spacewatch ||  || align=right | 3.1 km || 
|-id=580 bgcolor=#E9E9E9
| 538580 ||  || — || October 31, 2005 || Kitt Peak || Spacewatch ||  || align=right | 1.1 km || 
|-id=581 bgcolor=#E9E9E9
| 538581 ||  || — || March 4, 2016 || Haleakala || Pan-STARRS ||  || align=right | 1.5 km || 
|-id=582 bgcolor=#E9E9E9
| 538582 ||  || — || February 13, 2007 || Mount Lemmon || Mount Lemmon Survey ||  || align=right | 1.4 km || 
|-id=583 bgcolor=#E9E9E9
| 538583 ||  || — || March 27, 2003 || Kitt Peak || Spacewatch ||  || align=right | 1.4 km || 
|-id=584 bgcolor=#fefefe
| 538584 ||  || — || November 19, 2003 || Kitt Peak || Spacewatch ||  || align=right data-sort-value="0.94" | 940 m || 
|-id=585 bgcolor=#E9E9E9
| 538585 ||  || — || January 9, 2015 || Haleakala || Pan-STARRS ||  || align=right | 1.3 km || 
|-id=586 bgcolor=#d6d6d6
| 538586 ||  || — || October 29, 2008 || Kitt Peak || Spacewatch ||  || align=right | 3.1 km || 
|-id=587 bgcolor=#E9E9E9
| 538587 ||  || — || October 21, 2014 || Catalina || CSS ||  || align=right | 1.1 km || 
|-id=588 bgcolor=#E9E9E9
| 538588 ||  || — || April 1, 2012 || Mount Lemmon || Mount Lemmon Survey ||  || align=right data-sort-value="0.89" | 890 m || 
|-id=589 bgcolor=#d6d6d6
| 538589 ||  || — || October 14, 2013 || Mount Lemmon || Mount Lemmon Survey ||  || align=right | 2.0 km || 
|-id=590 bgcolor=#E9E9E9
| 538590 ||  || — || November 26, 2014 || Haleakala || Pan-STARRS ||  || align=right | 1.3 km || 
|-id=591 bgcolor=#E9E9E9
| 538591 ||  || — || November 11, 2006 || Kitt Peak || Spacewatch ||  || align=right data-sort-value="0.85" | 850 m || 
|-id=592 bgcolor=#d6d6d6
| 538592 ||  || — || May 9, 2011 || Mount Lemmon || Mount Lemmon Survey ||  || align=right | 3.0 km || 
|-id=593 bgcolor=#d6d6d6
| 538593 ||  || — || January 15, 2015 || Mount Lemmon || Mount Lemmon Survey ||  || align=right | 3.0 km || 
|-id=594 bgcolor=#E9E9E9
| 538594 ||  || — || April 4, 2008 || Kitt Peak || Spacewatch ||  || align=right data-sort-value="0.99" | 990 m || 
|-id=595 bgcolor=#E9E9E9
| 538595 ||  || — || September 26, 2009 || Kitt Peak || Spacewatch ||  || align=right | 1.4 km || 
|-id=596 bgcolor=#d6d6d6
| 538596 ||  || — || March 4, 2016 || Haleakala || Pan-STARRS ||  || align=right | 2.8 km || 
|-id=597 bgcolor=#d6d6d6
| 538597 ||  || — || November 26, 2013 || Haleakala || Pan-STARRS ||  || align=right | 2.4 km || 
|-id=598 bgcolor=#E9E9E9
| 538598 ||  || — || January 17, 2015 || Haleakala || Pan-STARRS ||  || align=right | 2.0 km || 
|-id=599 bgcolor=#E9E9E9
| 538599 ||  || — || November 19, 2009 || Kitt Peak || Spacewatch ||  || align=right | 2.1 km || 
|-id=600 bgcolor=#d6d6d6
| 538600 ||  || — || October 5, 2013 || Kitt Peak || Spacewatch ||  || align=right | 2.9 km || 
|}

538601–538700 

|-bgcolor=#fefefe
| 538601 ||  || — || February 3, 2012 || Haleakala || Pan-STARRS ||  || align=right data-sort-value="0.60" | 600 m || 
|-id=602 bgcolor=#fefefe
| 538602 ||  || — || November 16, 2014 || Mount Lemmon || Mount Lemmon Survey ||  || align=right data-sort-value="0.73" | 730 m || 
|-id=603 bgcolor=#E9E9E9
| 538603 ||  || — || April 15, 2012 || Haleakala || Pan-STARRS ||  || align=right | 1.1 km || 
|-id=604 bgcolor=#d6d6d6
| 538604 ||  || — || January 23, 2015 || Haleakala || Pan-STARRS ||  || align=right | 2.5 km || 
|-id=605 bgcolor=#E9E9E9
| 538605 ||  || — || December 14, 2010 || Mount Lemmon || Mount Lemmon Survey ||  || align=right | 1.1 km || 
|-id=606 bgcolor=#d6d6d6
| 538606 ||  || — || August 26, 2012 || Haleakala || Pan-STARRS ||  || align=right | 2.7 km || 
|-id=607 bgcolor=#E9E9E9
| 538607 ||  || — || November 18, 2014 || Mount Lemmon || Mount Lemmon Survey ||  || align=right data-sort-value="0.75" | 750 m || 
|-id=608 bgcolor=#E9E9E9
| 538608 ||  || — || December 10, 2014 || Mount Lemmon || Mount Lemmon Survey ||  || align=right | 1.3 km || 
|-id=609 bgcolor=#E9E9E9
| 538609 ||  || — || April 30, 2003 || Kitt Peak || Spacewatch ||  || align=right | 1.1 km || 
|-id=610 bgcolor=#d6d6d6
| 538610 ||  || — || January 21, 2015 || Haleakala || Pan-STARRS ||  || align=right | 2.8 km || 
|-id=611 bgcolor=#E9E9E9
| 538611 ||  || — || December 26, 2014 || Haleakala || Pan-STARRS ||  || align=right | 2.7 km || 
|-id=612 bgcolor=#E9E9E9
| 538612 ||  || — || December 11, 2010 || Mount Lemmon || Mount Lemmon Survey ||  || align=right | 1.2 km || 
|-id=613 bgcolor=#fefefe
| 538613 ||  || — || January 26, 2012 || Mount Lemmon || Mount Lemmon Survey ||  || align=right data-sort-value="0.57" | 570 m || 
|-id=614 bgcolor=#E9E9E9
| 538614 ||  || — || January 30, 2011 || Haleakala || Pan-STARRS ||  || align=right | 1.4 km || 
|-id=615 bgcolor=#E9E9E9
| 538615 ||  || — || January 28, 2006 || Mount Lemmon || Mount Lemmon Survey ||  || align=right | 2.0 km || 
|-id=616 bgcolor=#d6d6d6
| 538616 ||  || — || September 9, 2013 || Haleakala || Pan-STARRS ||  || align=right | 2.0 km || 
|-id=617 bgcolor=#fefefe
| 538617 ||  || — || December 14, 2007 || Mount Lemmon || Mount Lemmon Survey ||  || align=right data-sort-value="0.50" | 500 m || 
|-id=618 bgcolor=#E9E9E9
| 538618 ||  || — || November 26, 2014 || Haleakala || Pan-STARRS ||  || align=right | 1.0 km || 
|-id=619 bgcolor=#d6d6d6
| 538619 ||  || — || March 10, 2016 || Haleakala || Pan-STARRS ||  || align=right | 1.8 km || 
|-id=620 bgcolor=#d6d6d6
| 538620 ||  || — || October 3, 2013 || Mount Lemmon || Mount Lemmon Survey ||  || align=right | 2.5 km || 
|-id=621 bgcolor=#fefefe
| 538621 ||  || — || January 19, 2012 || Kitt Peak || Spacewatch ||  || align=right data-sort-value="0.62" | 620 m || 
|-id=622 bgcolor=#E9E9E9
| 538622 ||  || — || September 29, 2005 || Kitt Peak || Spacewatch ||  || align=right | 1.3 km || 
|-id=623 bgcolor=#d6d6d6
| 538623 ||  || — || October 9, 2007 || Kitt Peak || Spacewatch ||  || align=right | 2.6 km || 
|-id=624 bgcolor=#fefefe
| 538624 ||  || — || March 10, 2016 || Haleakala || Pan-STARRS ||  || align=right data-sort-value="0.81" | 810 m || 
|-id=625 bgcolor=#E9E9E9
| 538625 ||  || — || August 22, 2001 || Kitt Peak || Spacewatch ||  || align=right data-sort-value="0.85" | 850 m || 
|-id=626 bgcolor=#d6d6d6
| 538626 ||  || — || October 8, 2007 || Kitt Peak || Spacewatch ||  || align=right | 2.6 km || 
|-id=627 bgcolor=#E9E9E9
| 538627 ||  || — || October 5, 2014 || Mount Lemmon || Mount Lemmon Survey ||  || align=right data-sort-value="0.78" | 780 m || 
|-id=628 bgcolor=#d6d6d6
| 538628 ||  || — || September 14, 2013 || Haleakala || Pan-STARRS ||  || align=right | 3.6 km || 
|-id=629 bgcolor=#E9E9E9
| 538629 ||  || — || August 29, 2005 || Kitt Peak || Spacewatch ||  || align=right | 1.1 km || 
|-id=630 bgcolor=#E9E9E9
| 538630 ||  || — || February 20, 2016 || Haleakala || Pan-STARRS ||  || align=right | 1.9 km || 
|-id=631 bgcolor=#fefefe
| 538631 ||  || — || October 17, 2010 || Mount Lemmon || Mount Lemmon Survey ||  || align=right data-sort-value="0.67" | 670 m || 
|-id=632 bgcolor=#d6d6d6
| 538632 ||  || — || October 12, 2013 || Kitt Peak || Spacewatch ||  || align=right | 3.0 km || 
|-id=633 bgcolor=#fefefe
| 538633 ||  || — || October 31, 2014 || Kitt Peak || Spacewatch ||  || align=right data-sort-value="0.49" | 490 m || 
|-id=634 bgcolor=#d6d6d6
| 538634 ||  || — || January 20, 2015 || Haleakala || Pan-STARRS ||  || align=right | 2.8 km || 
|-id=635 bgcolor=#d6d6d6
| 538635 ||  || — || October 9, 2013 || Kitt Peak || Spacewatch ||  || align=right | 2.7 km || 
|-id=636 bgcolor=#E9E9E9
| 538636 ||  || — || November 17, 2014 || Kitt Peak || Spacewatch ||  || align=right | 1.5 km || 
|-id=637 bgcolor=#E9E9E9
| 538637 ||  || — || November 21, 2014 || Haleakala || Pan-STARRS ||  || align=right | 1.2 km || 
|-id=638 bgcolor=#E9E9E9
| 538638 ||  || — || June 30, 2013 || Haleakala || Pan-STARRS ||  || align=right | 1.5 km || 
|-id=639 bgcolor=#E9E9E9
| 538639 ||  || — || November 16, 2006 || Mount Lemmon || Mount Lemmon Survey ||  || align=right | 1.7 km || 
|-id=640 bgcolor=#E9E9E9
| 538640 ||  || — || January 16, 2015 || Haleakala || Pan-STARRS ||  || align=right | 2.1 km || 
|-id=641 bgcolor=#fefefe
| 538641 ||  || — || March 11, 2016 || Haleakala || Pan-STARRS ||  || align=right data-sort-value="0.76" | 760 m || 
|-id=642 bgcolor=#fefefe
| 538642 ||  || — || March 5, 2016 || Haleakala || Pan-STARRS ||  || align=right data-sort-value="0.69" | 690 m || 
|-id=643 bgcolor=#d6d6d6
| 538643 ||  || — || March 3, 2016 || Haleakala || Pan-STARRS ||  || align=right | 2.4 km || 
|-id=644 bgcolor=#FFC2E0
| 538644 ||  || — || March 18, 2016 || Haleakala || Pan-STARRS || APO || align=right data-sort-value="0.45" | 450 m || 
|-id=645 bgcolor=#E9E9E9
| 538645 ||  || — || October 30, 2010 || Mount Lemmon || Mount Lemmon Survey ||  || align=right | 1.7 km || 
|-id=646 bgcolor=#E9E9E9
| 538646 ||  || — || March 10, 2008 || Kitt Peak || Spacewatch ||  || align=right | 1.1 km || 
|-id=647 bgcolor=#E9E9E9
| 538647 ||  || — || January 10, 2007 || Kitt Peak || Spacewatch ||  || align=right | 1.3 km || 
|-id=648 bgcolor=#FFC2E0
| 538648 ||  || — || March 17, 2016 || Mount Lemmon || Mount Lemmon Survey || APO || align=right data-sort-value="0.47" | 470 m || 
|-id=649 bgcolor=#E9E9E9
| 538649 ||  || — || April 20, 2012 || Siding Spring || SSS ||  || align=right | 1.7 km || 
|-id=650 bgcolor=#E9E9E9
| 538650 ||  || — || April 16, 2007 || Catalina || CSS ||  || align=right | 2.6 km || 
|-id=651 bgcolor=#fefefe
| 538651 ||  || — || June 6, 2010 || WISE || WISE ||  || align=right data-sort-value="0.95" | 950 m || 
|-id=652 bgcolor=#FA8072
| 538652 ||  || — || January 31, 2006 || Kitt Peak || Spacewatch ||  || align=right data-sort-value="0.47" | 470 m || 
|-id=653 bgcolor=#E9E9E9
| 538653 ||  || — || January 3, 2011 || Catalina || CSS ||  || align=right | 2.1 km || 
|-id=654 bgcolor=#E9E9E9
| 538654 ||  || — || November 17, 2014 || Mount Lemmon || Mount Lemmon Survey ||  || align=right | 1.5 km || 
|-id=655 bgcolor=#E9E9E9
| 538655 ||  || — || October 29, 2005 || Mount Lemmon || Mount Lemmon Survey ||  || align=right | 1.5 km || 
|-id=656 bgcolor=#fefefe
| 538656 ||  || — || May 1, 2010 || WISE || WISE ||  || align=right data-sort-value="0.79" | 790 m || 
|-id=657 bgcolor=#FA8072
| 538657 ||  || — || September 11, 2004 || Kitt Peak || Spacewatch ||  || align=right data-sort-value="0.43" | 430 m || 
|-id=658 bgcolor=#fefefe
| 538658 ||  || — || September 19, 2014 || Haleakala || Pan-STARRS ||  || align=right data-sort-value="0.77" | 770 m || 
|-id=659 bgcolor=#E9E9E9
| 538659 ||  || — || April 4, 2008 || Mount Lemmon || Mount Lemmon Survey ||  || align=right data-sort-value="0.94" | 940 m || 
|-id=660 bgcolor=#fefefe
| 538660 ||  || — || February 23, 2012 || Catalina || CSS ||  || align=right data-sort-value="0.89" | 890 m || 
|-id=661 bgcolor=#fefefe
| 538661 ||  || — || July 6, 2013 || Haleakala || Pan-STARRS ||  || align=right data-sort-value="0.65" | 650 m || 
|-id=662 bgcolor=#fefefe
| 538662 ||  || — || March 1, 2009 || Mount Lemmon || Mount Lemmon Survey ||  || align=right data-sort-value="0.82" | 820 m || 
|-id=663 bgcolor=#fefefe
| 538663 ||  || — || September 28, 2003 || Kitt Peak || Spacewatch ||  || align=right data-sort-value="0.69" | 690 m || 
|-id=664 bgcolor=#fefefe
| 538664 ||  || — || November 17, 2014 || Mount Lemmon || Mount Lemmon Survey ||  || align=right data-sort-value="0.70" | 700 m || 
|-id=665 bgcolor=#d6d6d6
| 538665 ||  || — || March 25, 2011 || Catalina || CSS ||  || align=right | 2.4 km || 
|-id=666 bgcolor=#fefefe
| 538666 ||  || — || February 1, 2012 || Mount Lemmon || Mount Lemmon Survey ||  || align=right data-sort-value="0.64" | 640 m || 
|-id=667 bgcolor=#E9E9E9
| 538667 ||  || — || February 7, 2011 || Mount Lemmon || Mount Lemmon Survey ||  || align=right | 1.3 km || 
|-id=668 bgcolor=#d6d6d6
| 538668 ||  || — || February 14, 2010 || Mount Lemmon || Mount Lemmon Survey ||  || align=right | 2.6 km || 
|-id=669 bgcolor=#fefefe
| 538669 ||  || — || January 10, 2008 || Kitt Peak || Spacewatch ||  || align=right data-sort-value="0.68" | 680 m || 
|-id=670 bgcolor=#E9E9E9
| 538670 ||  || — || October 29, 2005 || Catalina || CSS ||  || align=right | 1.6 km || 
|-id=671 bgcolor=#E9E9E9
| 538671 ||  || — || August 29, 2005 || Kitt Peak || Spacewatch ||  || align=right data-sort-value="0.88" | 880 m || 
|-id=672 bgcolor=#d6d6d6
| 538672 ||  || — || June 9, 2011 || Mount Lemmon || Mount Lemmon Survey ||  || align=right | 2.5 km || 
|-id=673 bgcolor=#E9E9E9
| 538673 ||  || — || October 3, 1997 || Kitt Peak || Spacewatch ||  || align=right data-sort-value="0.89" | 890 m || 
|-id=674 bgcolor=#fefefe
| 538674 ||  || — || November 25, 2005 || Kitt Peak || Spacewatch ||  || align=right data-sort-value="0.48" | 480 m || 
|-id=675 bgcolor=#E9E9E9
| 538675 ||  || — || March 10, 2007 || Kitt Peak || Spacewatch ||  || align=right | 1.2 km || 
|-id=676 bgcolor=#d6d6d6
| 538676 ||  || — || September 29, 2008 || Mount Lemmon || Mount Lemmon Survey ||  || align=right | 2.1 km || 
|-id=677 bgcolor=#fefefe
| 538677 ||  || — || January 13, 2005 || Catalina || CSS ||  || align=right data-sort-value="0.84" | 840 m || 
|-id=678 bgcolor=#fefefe
| 538678 ||  || — || October 26, 2011 || Haleakala || Pan-STARRS ||  || align=right data-sort-value="0.64" | 640 m || 
|-id=679 bgcolor=#E9E9E9
| 538679 ||  || — || March 15, 2007 || Kitt Peak || Spacewatch ||  || align=right | 2.5 km || 
|-id=680 bgcolor=#fefefe
| 538680 ||  || — || November 14, 2007 || Kitt Peak || Spacewatch ||  || align=right data-sort-value="0.55" | 550 m || 
|-id=681 bgcolor=#fefefe
| 538681 ||  || — || February 20, 2006 || Mount Lemmon || Mount Lemmon Survey ||  || align=right data-sort-value="0.60" | 600 m || 
|-id=682 bgcolor=#fefefe
| 538682 ||  || — || December 4, 2008 || Mount Lemmon || Mount Lemmon Survey ||  || align=right data-sort-value="0.53" | 530 m || 
|-id=683 bgcolor=#E9E9E9
| 538683 ||  || — || December 25, 2005 || Kitt Peak || Spacewatch ||  || align=right | 2.1 km || 
|-id=684 bgcolor=#E9E9E9
| 538684 ||  || — || October 24, 2009 || Kitt Peak || Spacewatch ||  || align=right | 2.0 km || 
|-id=685 bgcolor=#fefefe
| 538685 ||  || — || January 18, 2009 || Kitt Peak || Spacewatch ||  || align=right data-sort-value="0.65" | 650 m || 
|-id=686 bgcolor=#fefefe
| 538686 ||  || — || April 11, 2005 || Kitt Peak || Spacewatch ||  || align=right data-sort-value="0.72" | 720 m || 
|-id=687 bgcolor=#d6d6d6
| 538687 ||  || — || November 26, 2013 || Haleakala || Pan-STARRS ||  || align=right | 3.3 km || 
|-id=688 bgcolor=#fefefe
| 538688 ||  || — || January 18, 2009 || Kitt Peak || Spacewatch ||  || align=right data-sort-value="0.80" | 800 m || 
|-id=689 bgcolor=#E9E9E9
| 538689 ||  || — || November 10, 2005 || Kitt Peak || Spacewatch ||  || align=right | 1.7 km || 
|-id=690 bgcolor=#C2E0FF
| 538690 ||  || — || March 31, 2011 || Haleakala || Pan-STARRS || cubewano (cold) || align=right | 307 km || 
|-id=691 bgcolor=#C2E0FF
| 538691 ||  || — || March 15, 2011 || Haleakala || Pan-STARRS || cubewano (hot)critical || align=right | 267 km || 
|-id=692 bgcolor=#fefefe
| 538692 ||  || — || March 16, 2016 || Haleakala || Pan-STARRS ||  || align=right data-sort-value="0.57" | 570 m || 
|-id=693 bgcolor=#d6d6d6
| 538693 ||  || — || February 23, 2010 || WISE || WISE ||  || align=right | 3.5 km || 
|-id=694 bgcolor=#d6d6d6
| 538694 ||  || — || March 29, 2011 || Mount Lemmon || Mount Lemmon Survey ||  || align=right | 2.5 km || 
|-id=695 bgcolor=#d6d6d6
| 538695 ||  || — || November 3, 2008 || Mount Lemmon || Mount Lemmon Survey ||  || align=right | 2.2 km || 
|-id=696 bgcolor=#E9E9E9
| 538696 ||  || — || November 25, 2005 || Mount Lemmon || Mount Lemmon Survey ||  || align=right | 2.4 km || 
|-id=697 bgcolor=#E9E9E9
| 538697 ||  || — || March 25, 2007 || Mount Lemmon || Mount Lemmon Survey ||  || align=right | 2.0 km || 
|-id=698 bgcolor=#d6d6d6
| 538698 ||  || — || January 1, 2009 || Mount Lemmon || Mount Lemmon Survey ||  || align=right | 3.2 km || 
|-id=699 bgcolor=#E9E9E9
| 538699 ||  || — || November 29, 2014 || Haleakala || Pan-STARRS ||  || align=right | 1.2 km || 
|-id=700 bgcolor=#d6d6d6
| 538700 ||  || — || January 25, 2015 || Haleakala || Pan-STARRS ||  || align=right | 3.2 km || 
|}

538701–538800 

|-bgcolor=#E9E9E9
| 538701 ||  || — || March 17, 2016 || Haleakala || Pan-STARRS ||  || align=right | 1.3 km || 
|-id=702 bgcolor=#E9E9E9
| 538702 ||  || — || December 24, 2006 || Kitt Peak || Spacewatch ||  || align=right data-sort-value="0.79" | 790 m || 
|-id=703 bgcolor=#E9E9E9
| 538703 ||  || — || November 17, 2004 || Campo Imperatore || CINEOS ||  || align=right | 2.1 km || 
|-id=704 bgcolor=#E9E9E9
| 538704 ||  || — || March 26, 2007 || Mount Lemmon || Mount Lemmon Survey ||  || align=right | 1.7 km || 
|-id=705 bgcolor=#d6d6d6
| 538705 ||  || — || August 25, 2012 || Kitt Peak || Spacewatch ||  || align=right | 2.5 km || 
|-id=706 bgcolor=#d6d6d6
| 538706 ||  || — || April 29, 2011 || Mount Lemmon || Mount Lemmon Survey ||  || align=right | 2.3 km || 
|-id=707 bgcolor=#d6d6d6
| 538707 ||  || — || October 5, 2013 || Haleakala || Pan-STARRS ||  || align=right | 1.9 km || 
|-id=708 bgcolor=#d6d6d6
| 538708 ||  || — || August 26, 2012 || Haleakala || Pan-STARRS ||  || align=right | 2.4 km || 
|-id=709 bgcolor=#d6d6d6
| 538709 ||  || — || January 17, 2015 || Haleakala || Pan-STARRS ||  || align=right | 2.4 km || 
|-id=710 bgcolor=#E9E9E9
| 538710 ||  || — || November 5, 2010 || Mount Lemmon || Mount Lemmon Survey ||  || align=right | 1.0 km || 
|-id=711 bgcolor=#E9E9E9
| 538711 ||  || — || November 26, 2009 || Kitt Peak || Spacewatch ||  || align=right | 2.2 km || 
|-id=712 bgcolor=#d6d6d6
| 538712 ||  || — || November 29, 2013 || Haleakala || Pan-STARRS ||  || align=right | 3.4 km || 
|-id=713 bgcolor=#E9E9E9
| 538713 ||  || — || December 17, 2014 || Haleakala || Pan-STARRS ||  || align=right | 1.6 km || 
|-id=714 bgcolor=#E9E9E9
| 538714 ||  || — || November 29, 2014 || Mount Lemmon || Mount Lemmon Survey ||  || align=right | 2.3 km || 
|-id=715 bgcolor=#E9E9E9
| 538715 ||  || — || October 18, 2014 || Mount Lemmon || Mount Lemmon Survey ||  || align=right | 1.2 km || 
|-id=716 bgcolor=#E9E9E9
| 538716 ||  || — || November 16, 2009 || Kitt Peak || Spacewatch ||  || align=right | 2.5 km || 
|-id=717 bgcolor=#d6d6d6
| 538717 ||  || — || September 25, 2013 || Kitt Peak || Spacewatch ||  || align=right | 2.1 km || 
|-id=718 bgcolor=#E9E9E9
| 538718 ||  || — || December 10, 2014 || Haleakala || Pan-STARRS ||  || align=right data-sort-value="0.81" | 810 m || 
|-id=719 bgcolor=#d6d6d6
| 538719 ||  || — || April 30, 2011 || Mount Lemmon || Mount Lemmon Survey ||  || align=right | 2.5 km || 
|-id=720 bgcolor=#fefefe
| 538720 ||  || — || July 14, 2013 || Haleakala || Pan-STARRS ||  || align=right data-sort-value="0.84" | 840 m || 
|-id=721 bgcolor=#E9E9E9
| 538721 ||  || — || May 21, 2012 || Mount Lemmon || Mount Lemmon Survey ||  || align=right | 1.0 km || 
|-id=722 bgcolor=#fefefe
| 538722 ||  || — || August 16, 2010 || La Sagra || OAM Obs. ||  || align=right data-sort-value="0.61" | 610 m || 
|-id=723 bgcolor=#fefefe
| 538723 ||  || — || February 9, 2016 || Mount Lemmon || Mount Lemmon Survey ||  || align=right data-sort-value="0.97" | 970 m || 
|-id=724 bgcolor=#E9E9E9
| 538724 ||  || — || March 8, 2008 || Kitt Peak || Spacewatch ||  || align=right data-sort-value="0.89" | 890 m || 
|-id=725 bgcolor=#fefefe
| 538725 ||  || — || November 12, 2007 || Mount Lemmon || Mount Lemmon Survey ||  || align=right data-sort-value="0.73" | 730 m || 
|-id=726 bgcolor=#d6d6d6
| 538726 ||  || — || February 14, 2010 || Mount Lemmon || Mount Lemmon Survey ||  || align=right | 3.1 km || 
|-id=727 bgcolor=#E9E9E9
| 538727 ||  || — || December 1, 2005 || Kitt Peak || Spacewatch ||  || align=right | 2.2 km || 
|-id=728 bgcolor=#fefefe
| 538728 ||  || — || September 11, 2007 || Mount Lemmon || Mount Lemmon Survey ||  || align=right data-sort-value="0.50" | 500 m || 
|-id=729 bgcolor=#fefefe
| 538729 ||  || — || November 9, 2007 || Mount Lemmon || Mount Lemmon Survey ||  || align=right data-sort-value="0.68" | 680 m || 
|-id=730 bgcolor=#d6d6d6
| 538730 ||  || — || October 7, 2013 || Mount Lemmon || Mount Lemmon Survey ||  || align=right | 3.3 km || 
|-id=731 bgcolor=#d6d6d6
| 538731 ||  || — || November 1, 1999 || Kitt Peak || Spacewatch ||  || align=right | 1.9 km || 
|-id=732 bgcolor=#d6d6d6
| 538732 ||  || — || May 1, 2011 || Haleakala || Pan-STARRS ||  || align=right | 2.8 km || 
|-id=733 bgcolor=#E9E9E9
| 538733 ||  || — || September 3, 2013 || Haleakala || Pan-STARRS ||  || align=right | 2.3 km || 
|-id=734 bgcolor=#d6d6d6
| 538734 ||  || — || October 21, 2007 || Mount Lemmon || Mount Lemmon Survey ||  || align=right | 3.5 km || 
|-id=735 bgcolor=#E9E9E9
| 538735 ||  || — || March 13, 2007 || Mount Lemmon || Mount Lemmon Survey ||  || align=right | 1.8 km || 
|-id=736 bgcolor=#d6d6d6
| 538736 ||  || — || May 3, 2011 || Mount Lemmon || Mount Lemmon Survey ||  || align=right | 2.8 km || 
|-id=737 bgcolor=#d6d6d6
| 538737 ||  || — || April 12, 2011 || Mount Lemmon || Mount Lemmon Survey ||  || align=right | 2.6 km || 
|-id=738 bgcolor=#fefefe
| 538738 ||  || — || January 13, 2005 || Kitt Peak || Spacewatch ||  || align=right data-sort-value="0.62" | 620 m || 
|-id=739 bgcolor=#E9E9E9
| 538739 ||  || — || March 5, 2008 || Kitt Peak || Spacewatch ||  || align=right data-sort-value="0.73" | 730 m || 
|-id=740 bgcolor=#d6d6d6
| 538740 ||  || — || March 11, 2005 || Mount Lemmon || Mount Lemmon Survey ||  || align=right | 2.5 km || 
|-id=741 bgcolor=#E9E9E9
| 538741 ||  || — || February 27, 2012 || Haleakala || Pan-STARRS ||  || align=right data-sort-value="0.98" | 980 m || 
|-id=742 bgcolor=#E9E9E9
| 538742 ||  || — || March 28, 2012 || Mount Lemmon || Mount Lemmon Survey ||  || align=right data-sort-value="0.82" | 820 m || 
|-id=743 bgcolor=#fefefe
| 538743 ||  || — || August 8, 1999 || Kitt Peak || Spacewatch ||  || align=right data-sort-value="0.62" | 620 m || 
|-id=744 bgcolor=#fefefe
| 538744 ||  || — || October 17, 2010 || Mount Lemmon || Mount Lemmon Survey ||  || align=right data-sort-value="0.60" | 600 m || 
|-id=745 bgcolor=#d6d6d6
| 538745 ||  || — || July 28, 2008 || Mount Lemmon || Mount Lemmon Survey ||  || align=right | 2.8 km || 
|-id=746 bgcolor=#fefefe
| 538746 ||  || — || March 12, 2016 || Haleakala || Pan-STARRS ||  || align=right data-sort-value="0.69" | 690 m || 
|-id=747 bgcolor=#E9E9E9
| 538747 ||  || — || August 25, 2004 || Kitt Peak || Spacewatch ||  || align=right | 1.6 km || 
|-id=748 bgcolor=#d6d6d6
| 538748 ||  || — || May 27, 2010 || WISE || WISE ||  || align=right | 3.2 km || 
|-id=749 bgcolor=#fefefe
| 538749 ||  || — || March 3, 2009 || Kitt Peak || Spacewatch ||  || align=right data-sort-value="0.61" | 610 m || 
|-id=750 bgcolor=#d6d6d6
| 538750 ||  || — || October 22, 2008 || Mount Lemmon || Mount Lemmon Survey ||  || align=right | 2.7 km || 
|-id=751 bgcolor=#E9E9E9
| 538751 ||  || — || March 16, 2012 || Kitt Peak || Spacewatch ||  || align=right data-sort-value="0.86" | 860 m || 
|-id=752 bgcolor=#E9E9E9
| 538752 ||  || — || September 15, 2009 || Kitt Peak || Spacewatch ||  || align=right | 1.5 km || 
|-id=753 bgcolor=#E9E9E9
| 538753 ||  || — || September 10, 2013 || Haleakala || Pan-STARRS ||  || align=right | 1.7 km || 
|-id=754 bgcolor=#d6d6d6
| 538754 ||  || — || April 5, 2010 || WISE || WISE ||  || align=right | 5.2 km || 
|-id=755 bgcolor=#E9E9E9
| 538755 ||  || — || October 14, 2004 || Kitt Peak || Spacewatch ||  || align=right | 2.9 km || 
|-id=756 bgcolor=#fefefe
| 538756 ||  || — || December 30, 2007 || Mount Lemmon || Mount Lemmon Survey ||  || align=right data-sort-value="0.62" | 620 m || 
|-id=757 bgcolor=#E9E9E9
| 538757 ||  || — || April 27, 2012 || Haleakala || Pan-STARRS ||  || align=right | 1.5 km || 
|-id=758 bgcolor=#fefefe
| 538758 ||  || — || March 11, 2005 || Mount Lemmon || Mount Lemmon Survey ||  || align=right data-sort-value="0.78" | 780 m || 
|-id=759 bgcolor=#d6d6d6
| 538759 ||  || — || November 18, 2008 || Kitt Peak || Spacewatch ||  || align=right | 2.0 km || 
|-id=760 bgcolor=#d6d6d6
| 538760 ||  || — || October 1, 2013 || Kitt Peak || Spacewatch ||  || align=right | 2.5 km || 
|-id=761 bgcolor=#d6d6d6
| 538761 ||  || — || January 11, 2015 || Haleakala || Pan-STARRS ||  || align=right | 2.7 km || 
|-id=762 bgcolor=#d6d6d6
| 538762 ||  || — || April 13, 2011 || Kitt Peak || Spacewatch ||  || align=right | 2.3 km || 
|-id=763 bgcolor=#d6d6d6
| 538763 ||  || — || October 26, 2008 || Mount Lemmon || Mount Lemmon Survey ||  || align=right | 2.7 km || 
|-id=764 bgcolor=#fefefe
| 538764 ||  || — || December 30, 2007 || Kitt Peak || Spacewatch ||  || align=right data-sort-value="0.68" | 680 m || 
|-id=765 bgcolor=#d6d6d6
| 538765 ||  || — || September 7, 2008 || Mount Lemmon || Mount Lemmon Survey ||  || align=right | 2.0 km || 
|-id=766 bgcolor=#E9E9E9
| 538766 ||  || — || March 4, 2016 || Haleakala || Pan-STARRS ||  || align=right | 1.8 km || 
|-id=767 bgcolor=#E9E9E9
| 538767 ||  || — || October 15, 2014 || Kitt Peak || Spacewatch ||  || align=right data-sort-value="0.71" | 710 m || 
|-id=768 bgcolor=#E9E9E9
| 538768 ||  || — || October 1, 2013 || Mount Lemmon || Mount Lemmon Survey ||  || align=right | 1.5 km || 
|-id=769 bgcolor=#d6d6d6
| 538769 ||  || — || October 3, 2013 || Kitt Peak || Spacewatch ||  || align=right | 2.5 km || 
|-id=770 bgcolor=#fefefe
| 538770 ||  || — || October 8, 2010 || Kitt Peak || Spacewatch ||  || align=right data-sort-value="0.58" | 580 m || 
|-id=771 bgcolor=#E9E9E9
| 538771 ||  || — || December 24, 2005 || Kitt Peak || Spacewatch ||  || align=right | 1.7 km || 
|-id=772 bgcolor=#d6d6d6
| 538772 ||  || — || September 20, 2008 || Mount Lemmon || Mount Lemmon Survey ||  || align=right | 2.4 km || 
|-id=773 bgcolor=#E9E9E9
| 538773 ||  || — || September 16, 2009 || Kitt Peak || Spacewatch ||  || align=right | 1.2 km || 
|-id=774 bgcolor=#E9E9E9
| 538774 ||  || — || January 2, 2011 || Mount Lemmon || Mount Lemmon Survey ||  || align=right | 1.0 km || 
|-id=775 bgcolor=#E9E9E9
| 538775 ||  || — || October 18, 2014 || Mount Lemmon || Mount Lemmon Survey ||  || align=right data-sort-value="0.86" | 860 m || 
|-id=776 bgcolor=#d6d6d6
| 538776 ||  || — || December 24, 2014 || Mount Lemmon || Mount Lemmon Survey ||  || align=right | 2.0 km || 
|-id=777 bgcolor=#fefefe
| 538777 ||  || — || January 25, 2012 || Haleakala || Pan-STARRS ||  || align=right data-sort-value="0.74" | 740 m || 
|-id=778 bgcolor=#E9E9E9
| 538778 ||  || — || March 15, 2007 || Mount Lemmon || Mount Lemmon Survey ||  || align=right | 2.2 km || 
|-id=779 bgcolor=#fefefe
| 538779 ||  || — || March 11, 2016 || Haleakala || Pan-STARRS ||  || align=right data-sort-value="0.53" | 530 m || 
|-id=780 bgcolor=#d6d6d6
| 538780 ||  || — || January 13, 2015 || Haleakala || Pan-STARRS ||  || align=right | 1.9 km || 
|-id=781 bgcolor=#E9E9E9
| 538781 ||  || — || December 21, 2014 || Haleakala || Pan-STARRS ||  || align=right | 1.6 km || 
|-id=782 bgcolor=#d6d6d6
| 538782 ||  || — || March 3, 2006 || Kitt Peak || Spacewatch ||  || align=right | 2.1 km || 
|-id=783 bgcolor=#d6d6d6
| 538783 ||  || — || October 10, 2007 || Mount Lemmon || Mount Lemmon Survey ||  || align=right | 2.6 km || 
|-id=784 bgcolor=#E9E9E9
| 538784 ||  || — || March 10, 2007 || Mount Lemmon || Mount Lemmon Survey ||  || align=right | 2.4 km || 
|-id=785 bgcolor=#E9E9E9
| 538785 ||  || — || October 2, 1997 || Caussols || ODAS ||  || align=right data-sort-value="0.94" | 940 m || 
|-id=786 bgcolor=#d6d6d6
| 538786 ||  || — || January 7, 2010 || Mount Lemmon || Mount Lemmon Survey ||  || align=right | 2.4 km || 
|-id=787 bgcolor=#d6d6d6
| 538787 ||  || — || September 17, 2013 || Mount Lemmon || Mount Lemmon Survey ||  || align=right | 2.2 km || 
|-id=788 bgcolor=#fefefe
| 538788 ||  || — || January 18, 2009 || Kitt Peak || Spacewatch ||  || align=right data-sort-value="0.46" | 460 m || 
|-id=789 bgcolor=#fefefe
| 538789 ||  || — || November 26, 2014 || Haleakala || Pan-STARRS ||  || align=right data-sort-value="0.94" | 940 m || 
|-id=790 bgcolor=#d6d6d6
| 538790 ||  || — || December 14, 2004 || Kitt Peak || Spacewatch ||  || align=right | 2.3 km || 
|-id=791 bgcolor=#E9E9E9
| 538791 ||  || — || September 2, 2008 || Kitt Peak || Spacewatch || AGN || align=right | 1.2 km || 
|-id=792 bgcolor=#E9E9E9
| 538792 ||  || — || March 31, 2008 || Kitt Peak || Spacewatch ||  || align=right | 1.1 km || 
|-id=793 bgcolor=#E9E9E9
| 538793 ||  || — || December 20, 2014 || Kitt Peak || Spacewatch ||  || align=right | 2.2 km || 
|-id=794 bgcolor=#d6d6d6
| 538794 ||  || — || October 13, 2007 || Mount Lemmon || Mount Lemmon Survey ||  || align=right | 2.5 km || 
|-id=795 bgcolor=#d6d6d6
| 538795 ||  || — || April 15, 1994 || Kitt Peak || Spacewatch ||  || align=right | 2.8 km || 
|-id=796 bgcolor=#d6d6d6
| 538796 ||  || — || May 3, 2006 || Kitt Peak || Spacewatch ||  || align=right | 1.9 km || 
|-id=797 bgcolor=#fefefe
| 538797 ||  || — || March 6, 2016 || Haleakala || Pan-STARRS ||  || align=right data-sort-value="0.60" | 600 m || 
|-id=798 bgcolor=#fefefe
| 538798 ||  || — || October 2, 2010 || Kitt Peak || Spacewatch ||  || align=right data-sort-value="0.66" | 660 m || 
|-id=799 bgcolor=#d6d6d6
| 538799 ||  || — || May 14, 2005 || Mount Lemmon || Mount Lemmon Survey ||  || align=right | 2.9 km || 
|-id=800 bgcolor=#d6d6d6
| 538800 ||  || — || January 15, 2005 || Catalina || CSS ||  || align=right | 3.3 km || 
|}

538801–538900 

|-bgcolor=#d6d6d6
| 538801 ||  || — || November 5, 2007 || Kitt Peak || Spacewatch ||  || align=right | 3.4 km || 
|-id=802 bgcolor=#E9E9E9
| 538802 ||  || — || September 6, 1999 || Kitt Peak || Spacewatch || PAD || align=right | 1.4 km || 
|-id=803 bgcolor=#fefefe
| 538803 ||  || — || March 28, 2009 || Catalina || CSS ||  || align=right data-sort-value="0.83" | 830 m || 
|-id=804 bgcolor=#E9E9E9
| 538804 ||  || — || January 19, 2015 || Haleakala || Pan-STARRS || MAR || align=right data-sort-value="0.92" | 920 m || 
|-id=805 bgcolor=#d6d6d6
| 538805 ||  || — || March 12, 2016 || Haleakala || Pan-STARRS ||  || align=right | 2.0 km || 
|-id=806 bgcolor=#d6d6d6
| 538806 ||  || — || July 18, 2013 || Haleakala || Pan-STARRS ||  || align=right | 3.4 km || 
|-id=807 bgcolor=#d6d6d6
| 538807 ||  || — || July 14, 2013 || Haleakala || Pan-STARRS ||  || align=right | 3.0 km || 
|-id=808 bgcolor=#E9E9E9
| 538808 ||  || — || December 26, 2005 || Kitt Peak || Spacewatch ||  || align=right | 2.1 km || 
|-id=809 bgcolor=#E9E9E9
| 538809 ||  || — || October 28, 2014 || Mount Lemmon || Mount Lemmon Survey ||  || align=right | 2.4 km || 
|-id=810 bgcolor=#fefefe
| 538810 ||  || — || October 22, 2006 || Kitt Peak || Spacewatch ||  || align=right data-sort-value="0.76" | 760 m || 
|-id=811 bgcolor=#d6d6d6
| 538811 ||  || — || February 14, 2005 || Kitt Peak || Spacewatch ||  || align=right | 2.9 km || 
|-id=812 bgcolor=#E9E9E9
| 538812 ||  || — || January 31, 2006 || Kitt Peak || Spacewatch ||  || align=right | 2.6 km || 
|-id=813 bgcolor=#E9E9E9
| 538813 ||  || — || June 17, 2005 || Siding Spring || SSS ||  || align=right | 2.1 km || 
|-id=814 bgcolor=#E9E9E9
| 538814 ||  || — || October 13, 2010 || Mount Lemmon || Mount Lemmon Survey ||  || align=right data-sort-value="0.68" | 680 m || 
|-id=815 bgcolor=#E9E9E9
| 538815 ||  || — || March 27, 2012 || Haleakala || Pan-STARRS ||  || align=right data-sort-value="0.95" | 950 m || 
|-id=816 bgcolor=#d6d6d6
| 538816 ||  || — || October 24, 2008 || Mount Lemmon || Mount Lemmon Survey ||  || align=right | 3.6 km || 
|-id=817 bgcolor=#E9E9E9
| 538817 ||  || — || March 12, 2007 || Kitt Peak || Spacewatch ||  || align=right | 2.8 km || 
|-id=818 bgcolor=#fefefe
| 538818 ||  || — || March 8, 2005 || Mount Lemmon || Mount Lemmon Survey ||  || align=right data-sort-value="0.71" | 710 m || 
|-id=819 bgcolor=#fefefe
| 538819 ||  || — || June 1, 2014 || Haleakala || Pan-STARRS || H || align=right data-sort-value="0.68" | 680 m || 
|-id=820 bgcolor=#E9E9E9
| 538820 ||  || — || April 11, 2008 || Catalina || CSS ||  || align=right | 1.1 km || 
|-id=821 bgcolor=#d6d6d6
| 538821 ||  || — || March 27, 2011 || Mount Lemmon || Mount Lemmon Survey ||  || align=right | 2.9 km || 
|-id=822 bgcolor=#E9E9E9
| 538822 ||  || — || August 31, 2014 || Haleakala || Pan-STARRS ||  || align=right data-sort-value="0.82" | 820 m || 
|-id=823 bgcolor=#fefefe
| 538823 ||  || — || April 28, 2009 || Mount Lemmon || Mount Lemmon Survey ||  || align=right data-sort-value="0.49" | 490 m || 
|-id=824 bgcolor=#E9E9E9
| 538824 ||  || — || December 10, 2009 || Mount Lemmon || Mount Lemmon Survey || AGN || align=right | 1.1 km || 
|-id=825 bgcolor=#d6d6d6
| 538825 ||  || — || February 25, 2006 || Kitt Peak || Spacewatch ||  || align=right | 2.5 km || 
|-id=826 bgcolor=#E9E9E9
| 538826 ||  || — || March 27, 2011 || Mount Lemmon || Mount Lemmon Survey ||  || align=right | 2.1 km || 
|-id=827 bgcolor=#E9E9E9
| 538827 ||  || — || May 12, 2012 || Mount Lemmon || Mount Lemmon Survey ||  || align=right data-sort-value="0.76" | 760 m || 
|-id=828 bgcolor=#E9E9E9
| 538828 ||  || — || March 31, 2016 || Haleakala || Pan-STARRS ||  || align=right | 1.7 km || 
|-id=829 bgcolor=#E9E9E9
| 538829 ||  || — || November 9, 2009 || Mount Lemmon || Mount Lemmon Survey ||  || align=right | 2.2 km || 
|-id=830 bgcolor=#d6d6d6
| 538830 ||  || — || September 12, 2007 || Mount Lemmon || Mount Lemmon Survey ||  || align=right | 3.4 km || 
|-id=831 bgcolor=#d6d6d6
| 538831 ||  || — || November 6, 2013 || Haleakala || Pan-STARRS ||  || align=right | 2.8 km || 
|-id=832 bgcolor=#E9E9E9
| 538832 ||  || — || May 21, 2012 || Haleakala || Pan-STARRS ||  || align=right data-sort-value="0.90" | 900 m || 
|-id=833 bgcolor=#fefefe
| 538833 ||  || — || August 14, 2013 || Haleakala || Pan-STARRS ||  || align=right data-sort-value="0.81" | 810 m || 
|-id=834 bgcolor=#fefefe
| 538834 ||  || — || April 4, 2005 || Catalina || CSS ||  || align=right data-sort-value="0.62" | 620 m || 
|-id=835 bgcolor=#fefefe
| 538835 ||  || — || March 4, 2012 || Mount Lemmon || Mount Lemmon Survey ||  || align=right data-sort-value="0.74" | 740 m || 
|-id=836 bgcolor=#fefefe
| 538836 ||  || — || April 8, 2006 || Kitt Peak || Spacewatch ||  || align=right data-sort-value="0.83" | 830 m || 
|-id=837 bgcolor=#d6d6d6
| 538837 ||  || — || May 12, 2010 || Mount Lemmon || Mount Lemmon Survey ||  || align=right | 3.2 km || 
|-id=838 bgcolor=#d6d6d6
| 538838 ||  || — || March 29, 2010 || WISE || WISE ||  || align=right | 3.8 km || 
|-id=839 bgcolor=#d6d6d6
| 538839 ||  || — || September 12, 2007 || Mount Lemmon || Mount Lemmon Survey ||  || align=right | 2.6 km || 
|-id=840 bgcolor=#E9E9E9
| 538840 ||  || — || September 10, 2005 || Anderson Mesa || LONEOS ||  || align=right | 1.5 km || 
|-id=841 bgcolor=#d6d6d6
| 538841 ||  || — || September 12, 2007 || Kitt Peak || Spacewatch || EOS || align=right | 1.7 km || 
|-id=842 bgcolor=#d6d6d6
| 538842 ||  || — || April 6, 2005 || Mount Lemmon || Mount Lemmon Survey ||  || align=right | 3.0 km || 
|-id=843 bgcolor=#E9E9E9
| 538843 ||  || — || November 25, 2006 || Kitt Peak || Spacewatch ||  || align=right data-sort-value="0.95" | 950 m || 
|-id=844 bgcolor=#E9E9E9
| 538844 ||  || — || March 7, 2003 || Anderson Mesa || LONEOS ||  || align=right | 1.8 km || 
|-id=845 bgcolor=#fefefe
| 538845 ||  || — || March 18, 2009 || Kitt Peak || Spacewatch ||  || align=right data-sort-value="0.65" | 650 m || 
|-id=846 bgcolor=#E9E9E9
| 538846 ||  || — || September 3, 2013 || Haleakala || Pan-STARRS ||  || align=right | 1.4 km || 
|-id=847 bgcolor=#fefefe
| 538847 ||  || — || April 9, 2002 || Kitt Peak || Spacewatch ||  || align=right data-sort-value="0.50" | 500 m || 
|-id=848 bgcolor=#d6d6d6
| 538848 ||  || — || January 23, 2015 || Haleakala || Pan-STARRS ||  || align=right | 2.9 km || 
|-id=849 bgcolor=#fefefe
| 538849 ||  || — || September 1, 2013 || Mount Lemmon || Mount Lemmon Survey ||  || align=right data-sort-value="0.65" | 650 m || 
|-id=850 bgcolor=#d6d6d6
| 538850 ||  || — || February 9, 2005 || Mount Lemmon || Mount Lemmon Survey ||  || align=right | 2.7 km || 
|-id=851 bgcolor=#d6d6d6
| 538851 ||  || — || February 17, 2015 || Haleakala || Pan-STARRS ||  || align=right | 2.4 km || 
|-id=852 bgcolor=#E9E9E9
| 538852 ||  || — || June 14, 2012 || Mount Lemmon || Mount Lemmon Survey ||  || align=right | 1.3 km || 
|-id=853 bgcolor=#d6d6d6
| 538853 ||  || — || October 4, 2007 || Kitt Peak || Spacewatch ||  || align=right | 3.2 km || 
|-id=854 bgcolor=#fefefe
| 538854 ||  || — || September 25, 1995 || Kitt Peak || Spacewatch ||  || align=right data-sort-value="0.76" | 760 m || 
|-id=855 bgcolor=#fefefe
| 538855 ||  || — || October 21, 2003 || Kitt Peak || Spacewatch ||  || align=right data-sort-value="0.89" | 890 m || 
|-id=856 bgcolor=#E9E9E9
| 538856 ||  || — || September 14, 2013 || Kitt Peak || Spacewatch ||  || align=right | 1.8 km || 
|-id=857 bgcolor=#E9E9E9
| 538857 ||  || — || March 1, 2011 || Mount Lemmon || Mount Lemmon Survey ||  || align=right | 1.7 km || 
|-id=858 bgcolor=#d6d6d6
| 538858 ||  || — || October 11, 2007 || Catalina || CSS ||  || align=right | 2.8 km || 
|-id=859 bgcolor=#d6d6d6
| 538859 ||  || — || January 25, 2010 || WISE || WISE ||  || align=right | 3.7 km || 
|-id=860 bgcolor=#d6d6d6
| 538860 ||  || — || May 28, 2011 || Mount Lemmon || Mount Lemmon Survey ||  || align=right | 2.1 km || 
|-id=861 bgcolor=#fefefe
| 538861 ||  || — || March 17, 2005 || Mount Lemmon || Mount Lemmon Survey ||  || align=right data-sort-value="0.60" | 600 m || 
|-id=862 bgcolor=#E9E9E9
| 538862 ||  || — || April 28, 2012 || Mount Lemmon || Mount Lemmon Survey ||  || align=right | 1.1 km || 
|-id=863 bgcolor=#E9E9E9
| 538863 ||  || — || January 30, 2011 || Haleakala || Pan-STARRS ||  || align=right data-sort-value="0.77" | 770 m || 
|-id=864 bgcolor=#E9E9E9
| 538864 ||  || — || May 21, 2012 || Haleakala || Pan-STARRS ||  || align=right data-sort-value="0.86" | 860 m || 
|-id=865 bgcolor=#d6d6d6
| 538865 ||  || — || December 4, 2008 || Kitt Peak || Spacewatch ||  || align=right | 2.7 km || 
|-id=866 bgcolor=#d6d6d6
| 538866 ||  || — || April 5, 2011 || Kitt Peak || Spacewatch ||  || align=right | 2.8 km || 
|-id=867 bgcolor=#E9E9E9
| 538867 ||  || — || January 10, 2007 || Mount Lemmon || Mount Lemmon Survey ||  || align=right | 1.3 km || 
|-id=868 bgcolor=#E9E9E9
| 538868 ||  || — || February 10, 2011 || Mount Lemmon || Mount Lemmon Survey ||  || align=right | 1.4 km || 
|-id=869 bgcolor=#E9E9E9
| 538869 ||  || — || December 13, 2010 || Kitt Peak || Spacewatch ||  || align=right | 1.1 km || 
|-id=870 bgcolor=#E9E9E9
| 538870 ||  || — || April 10, 2016 || Haleakala || Pan-STARRS ||  || align=right data-sort-value="0.91" | 910 m || 
|-id=871 bgcolor=#fefefe
| 538871 ||  || — || April 14, 2016 || Haleakala || Pan-STARRS ||  || align=right data-sort-value="0.86" | 860 m || 
|-id=872 bgcolor=#E9E9E9
| 538872 ||  || — || August 29, 2009 || Kitt Peak || Spacewatch ||  || align=right | 2.8 km || 
|-id=873 bgcolor=#d6d6d6
| 538873 ||  || — || October 20, 2007 || Mount Lemmon || Mount Lemmon Survey ||  || align=right | 2.5 km || 
|-id=874 bgcolor=#E9E9E9
| 538874 ||  || — || September 29, 1995 || Kitt Peak || Spacewatch ||  || align=right | 1.6 km || 
|-id=875 bgcolor=#d6d6d6
| 538875 ||  || — || April 10, 2016 || Haleakala || Pan-STARRS ||  || align=right | 3.1 km || 
|-id=876 bgcolor=#E9E9E9
| 538876 ||  || — || November 10, 2013 || Mount Lemmon || Mount Lemmon Survey ||  || align=right | 1.6 km || 
|-id=877 bgcolor=#d6d6d6
| 538877 ||  || — || November 2, 2007 || Mount Lemmon || Mount Lemmon Survey ||  || align=right | 2.9 km || 
|-id=878 bgcolor=#d6d6d6
| 538878 ||  || — || October 12, 2007 || Mount Lemmon || Mount Lemmon Survey ||  || align=right | 2.8 km || 
|-id=879 bgcolor=#d6d6d6
| 538879 ||  || — || December 25, 2013 || Kitt Peak || Spacewatch ||  || align=right | 2.6 km || 
|-id=880 bgcolor=#E9E9E9
| 538880 ||  || — || May 22, 2012 || Mount Lemmon || Mount Lemmon Survey ||  || align=right data-sort-value="0.94" | 940 m || 
|-id=881 bgcolor=#d6d6d6
| 538881 ||  || — || January 24, 2015 || Haleakala || Pan-STARRS ||  || align=right | 2.2 km || 
|-id=882 bgcolor=#d6d6d6
| 538882 ||  || — || October 15, 2013 || Mount Lemmon || Mount Lemmon Survey ||  || align=right | 3.1 km || 
|-id=883 bgcolor=#E9E9E9
| 538883 ||  || — || October 22, 2009 || Mount Lemmon || Mount Lemmon Survey ||  || align=right | 1.5 km || 
|-id=884 bgcolor=#d6d6d6
| 538884 ||  || — || October 6, 2012 || Haleakala || Pan-STARRS ||  || align=right | 3.0 km || 
|-id=885 bgcolor=#E9E9E9
| 538885 ||  || — || March 2, 2011 || Mount Lemmon || Mount Lemmon Survey ||  || align=right | 2.3 km || 
|-id=886 bgcolor=#E9E9E9
| 538886 ||  || — || November 8, 2013 || Catalina || CSS ||  || align=right | 1.2 km || 
|-id=887 bgcolor=#E9E9E9
| 538887 ||  || — || April 14, 2007 || Mount Lemmon || Mount Lemmon Survey ||  || align=right | 1.8 km || 
|-id=888 bgcolor=#d6d6d6
| 538888 ||  || — || April 3, 2016 || Haleakala || Pan-STARRS ||  || align=right | 2.8 km || 
|-id=889 bgcolor=#d6d6d6
| 538889 ||  || — || November 1, 2008 || Mount Lemmon || Mount Lemmon Survey ||  || align=right | 3.0 km || 
|-id=890 bgcolor=#E9E9E9
| 538890 ||  || — || December 25, 2005 || Mount Lemmon || Mount Lemmon Survey ||  || align=right | 1.4 km || 
|-id=891 bgcolor=#d6d6d6
| 538891 ||  || — || August 13, 2012 || Haleakala || Pan-STARRS ||  || align=right | 2.6 km || 
|-id=892 bgcolor=#d6d6d6
| 538892 ||  || — || June 5, 2011 || Mount Lemmon || Mount Lemmon Survey ||  || align=right | 2.5 km || 
|-id=893 bgcolor=#d6d6d6
| 538893 ||  || — || November 12, 2013 || Kitt Peak || Spacewatch ||  || align=right | 2.7 km || 
|-id=894 bgcolor=#E9E9E9
| 538894 ||  || — || March 29, 2012 || Kitt Peak || Spacewatch ||  || align=right data-sort-value="0.89" | 890 m || 
|-id=895 bgcolor=#d6d6d6
| 538895 ||  || — || November 13, 2007 || Kitt Peak || Spacewatch ||  || align=right | 2.6 km || 
|-id=896 bgcolor=#E9E9E9
| 538896 ||  || — || April 6, 2008 || Kitt Peak || Spacewatch ||  || align=right data-sort-value="0.64" | 640 m || 
|-id=897 bgcolor=#d6d6d6
| 538897 ||  || — || October 23, 2012 || Catalina || CSS || Tj (2.99) || align=right | 3.5 km || 
|-id=898 bgcolor=#E9E9E9
| 538898 ||  || — || March 10, 2011 || Mount Lemmon || Mount Lemmon Survey ||  || align=right | 1.8 km || 
|-id=899 bgcolor=#d6d6d6
| 538899 ||  || — || October 10, 2007 || Kitt Peak || Spacewatch ||  || align=right | 2.6 km || 
|-id=900 bgcolor=#d6d6d6
| 538900 ||  || — || November 27, 2013 || Haleakala || Pan-STARRS ||  || align=right | 2.4 km || 
|}

538901–539000 

|-bgcolor=#d6d6d6
| 538901 ||  || — || April 5, 2016 || Haleakala || Pan-STARRS ||  || align=right | 2.4 km || 
|-id=902 bgcolor=#d6d6d6
| 538902 ||  || — || January 27, 2015 || Haleakala || Pan-STARRS ||  || align=right | 2.4 km || 
|-id=903 bgcolor=#d6d6d6
| 538903 ||  || — || October 4, 2012 || Mount Lemmon || Mount Lemmon Survey ||  || align=right | 2.9 km || 
|-id=904 bgcolor=#d6d6d6
| 538904 ||  || — || January 23, 2015 || Haleakala || Pan-STARRS ||  || align=right | 2.4 km || 
|-id=905 bgcolor=#d6d6d6
| 538905 ||  || — || November 2, 2013 || Kitt Peak || Spacewatch ||  || align=right | 2.3 km || 
|-id=906 bgcolor=#E9E9E9
| 538906 ||  || — || December 11, 2014 || Mount Lemmon || Mount Lemmon Survey ||  || align=right | 1.2 km || 
|-id=907 bgcolor=#E9E9E9
| 538907 ||  || — || December 29, 2014 || Haleakala || Pan-STARRS ||  || align=right data-sort-value="0.92" | 920 m || 
|-id=908 bgcolor=#d6d6d6
| 538908 ||  || — || February 16, 2015 || Haleakala || Pan-STARRS ||  || align=right | 2.1 km || 
|-id=909 bgcolor=#E9E9E9
| 538909 ||  || — || January 18, 2015 || Mount Lemmon || Mount Lemmon Survey ||  || align=right | 1.9 km || 
|-id=910 bgcolor=#E9E9E9
| 538910 ||  || — || November 17, 2014 || Haleakala || Pan-STARRS ||  || align=right data-sort-value="0.69" | 690 m || 
|-id=911 bgcolor=#d6d6d6
| 538911 ||  || — || January 20, 2015 || Haleakala || Pan-STARRS ||  || align=right | 2.1 km || 
|-id=912 bgcolor=#E9E9E9
| 538912 ||  || — || April 12, 2016 || Haleakala || Pan-STARRS ||  || align=right data-sort-value="0.73" | 730 m || 
|-id=913 bgcolor=#d6d6d6
| 538913 ||  || — || October 24, 2012 || Haleakala || Pan-STARRS ||  || align=right | 2.7 km || 
|-id=914 bgcolor=#d6d6d6
| 538914 ||  || — || April 5, 2016 || Haleakala || Pan-STARRS ||  || align=right | 2.1 km || 
|-id=915 bgcolor=#fefefe
| 538915 ||  || — || April 6, 2016 || Mount Lemmon || Mount Lemmon Survey || H || align=right data-sort-value="0.53" | 530 m || 
|-id=916 bgcolor=#d6d6d6
| 538916 ||  || — || May 6, 2010 || WISE || WISE ||  || align=right | 3.3 km || 
|-id=917 bgcolor=#fefefe
| 538917 ||  || — || March 25, 2006 || Kitt Peak || Spacewatch ||  || align=right data-sort-value="0.82" | 820 m || 
|-id=918 bgcolor=#E9E9E9
| 538918 ||  || — || September 5, 2008 || Kitt Peak || Spacewatch ||  || align=right | 2.5 km || 
|-id=919 bgcolor=#d6d6d6
| 538919 ||  || — || March 9, 2010 || WISE || WISE ||  || align=right | 3.6 km || 
|-id=920 bgcolor=#fefefe
| 538920 ||  || — || February 10, 2016 || Haleakala || Pan-STARRS ||  || align=right data-sort-value="0.70" | 700 m || 
|-id=921 bgcolor=#E9E9E9
| 538921 ||  || — || October 22, 2009 || Mount Lemmon || Mount Lemmon Survey ||  || align=right | 2.0 km || 
|-id=922 bgcolor=#fefefe
| 538922 ||  || — || January 2, 2009 || Mount Lemmon || Mount Lemmon Survey ||  || align=right data-sort-value="0.57" | 570 m || 
|-id=923 bgcolor=#fefefe
| 538923 ||  || — || November 6, 2010 || Mount Lemmon || Mount Lemmon Survey ||  || align=right data-sort-value="0.75" | 750 m || 
|-id=924 bgcolor=#fefefe
| 538924 ||  || — || January 31, 2006 || Mount Lemmon || Mount Lemmon Survey ||  || align=right data-sort-value="0.53" | 530 m || 
|-id=925 bgcolor=#fefefe
| 538925 ||  || — || March 5, 2008 || Mount Lemmon || Mount Lemmon Survey ||  || align=right data-sort-value="0.75" | 750 m || 
|-id=926 bgcolor=#fefefe
| 538926 ||  || — || April 8, 2006 || Kitt Peak || Spacewatch ||  || align=right data-sort-value="0.55" | 550 m || 
|-id=927 bgcolor=#d6d6d6
| 538927 ||  || — || January 27, 2015 || Haleakala || Pan-STARRS ||  || align=right | 2.6 km || 
|-id=928 bgcolor=#E9E9E9
| 538928 ||  || — || September 29, 2005 || Kitt Peak || Spacewatch ||  || align=right | 3.6 km || 
|-id=929 bgcolor=#d6d6d6
| 538929 ||  || — || March 4, 2005 || Mount Lemmon || Mount Lemmon Survey ||  || align=right | 2.7 km || 
|-id=930 bgcolor=#fefefe
| 538930 ||  || — || March 8, 2008 || Kitt Peak || Spacewatch ||  || align=right data-sort-value="0.75" | 750 m || 
|-id=931 bgcolor=#E9E9E9
| 538931 ||  || — || September 23, 2008 || Mount Lemmon || Mount Lemmon Survey ||  || align=right | 1.8 km || 
|-id=932 bgcolor=#d6d6d6
| 538932 ||  || — || November 1, 2013 || Mount Lemmon || Mount Lemmon Survey ||  || align=right | 2.2 km || 
|-id=933 bgcolor=#fefefe
| 538933 ||  || — || February 3, 2012 || Mount Lemmon || Mount Lemmon Survey ||  || align=right data-sort-value="0.81" | 810 m || 
|-id=934 bgcolor=#fefefe
| 538934 ||  || — || May 4, 2006 || Kitt Peak || Spacewatch ||  || align=right data-sort-value="0.59" | 590 m || 
|-id=935 bgcolor=#d6d6d6
| 538935 ||  || — || January 23, 2015 || Haleakala || Pan-STARRS ||  || align=right | 3.1 km || 
|-id=936 bgcolor=#d6d6d6
| 538936 ||  || — || February 16, 2010 || Mount Lemmon || Mount Lemmon Survey ||  || align=right | 2.7 km || 
|-id=937 bgcolor=#d6d6d6
| 538937 ||  || — || April 8, 2010 || Kitt Peak || Spacewatch ||  || align=right | 3.4 km || 
|-id=938 bgcolor=#d6d6d6
| 538938 ||  || — || November 1, 2008 || Mount Lemmon || Mount Lemmon Survey ||  || align=right | 2.9 km || 
|-id=939 bgcolor=#fefefe
| 538939 ||  || — || December 12, 2014 || Haleakala || Pan-STARRS ||  || align=right | 1.3 km || 
|-id=940 bgcolor=#E9E9E9
| 538940 ||  || — || September 29, 2009 || Mount Lemmon || Mount Lemmon Survey ||  || align=right | 1.5 km || 
|-id=941 bgcolor=#E9E9E9
| 538941 ||  || — || February 7, 2002 || Kitt Peak || Spacewatch ||  || align=right | 2.4 km || 
|-id=942 bgcolor=#E9E9E9
| 538942 ||  || — || August 17, 2009 || Siding Spring || SSS ||  || align=right | 1.4 km || 
|-id=943 bgcolor=#E9E9E9
| 538943 ||  || — || December 8, 2010 || Mount Lemmon || Mount Lemmon Survey ||  || align=right | 1.7 km || 
|-id=944 bgcolor=#fefefe
| 538944 ||  || — || July 13, 2013 || Haleakala || Pan-STARRS ||  || align=right data-sort-value="0.59" | 590 m || 
|-id=945 bgcolor=#E9E9E9
| 538945 ||  || — || April 25, 2007 || Kitt Peak || Spacewatch ||  || align=right | 2.1 km || 
|-id=946 bgcolor=#d6d6d6
| 538946 ||  || — || March 9, 2010 || WISE || WISE ||  || align=right | 3.1 km || 
|-id=947 bgcolor=#E9E9E9
| 538947 ||  || — || May 12, 2012 || Catalina || CSS ||  || align=right | 1.0 km || 
|-id=948 bgcolor=#fefefe
| 538948 ||  || — || October 30, 2006 || Mount Lemmon || Mount Lemmon Survey ||  || align=right data-sort-value="0.82" | 820 m || 
|-id=949 bgcolor=#d6d6d6
| 538949 ||  || — || May 24, 2011 || Haleakala || Pan-STARRS ||  || align=right | 3.0 km || 
|-id=950 bgcolor=#d6d6d6
| 538950 ||  || — || April 30, 2011 || Kitt Peak || Spacewatch ||  || align=right | 2.4 km || 
|-id=951 bgcolor=#fefefe
| 538951 ||  || — || August 16, 2009 || Kitt Peak || Spacewatch ||  || align=right data-sort-value="0.75" | 750 m || 
|-id=952 bgcolor=#d6d6d6
| 538952 ||  || — || February 16, 2015 || Haleakala || Pan-STARRS ||  || align=right | 2.1 km || 
|-id=953 bgcolor=#fefefe
| 538953 ||  || — || December 5, 2007 || Kitt Peak || Spacewatch ||  || align=right data-sort-value="0.60" | 600 m || 
|-id=954 bgcolor=#fefefe
| 538954 ||  || — || May 4, 2009 || Mount Lemmon || Mount Lemmon Survey ||  || align=right data-sort-value="0.68" | 680 m || 
|-id=955 bgcolor=#d6d6d6
| 538955 ||  || — || June 8, 2011 || Mount Lemmon || Mount Lemmon Survey ||  || align=right | 2.7 km || 
|-id=956 bgcolor=#fefefe
| 538956 ||  || — || April 23, 2009 || Kitt Peak || Spacewatch ||  || align=right data-sort-value="0.57" | 570 m || 
|-id=957 bgcolor=#fefefe
| 538957 ||  || — || November 16, 2006 || Kitt Peak || Spacewatch ||  || align=right | 2.2 km || 
|-id=958 bgcolor=#d6d6d6
| 538958 ||  || — || January 15, 2015 || Haleakala || Pan-STARRS ||  || align=right | 3.3 km || 
|-id=959 bgcolor=#E9E9E9
| 538959 ||  || — || May 10, 2012 || Haleakala || Pan-STARRS ||  || align=right | 1.2 km || 
|-id=960 bgcolor=#E9E9E9
| 538960 ||  || — || January 23, 2006 || Kitt Peak || Spacewatch ||  || align=right | 1.8 km || 
|-id=961 bgcolor=#fefefe
| 538961 ||  || — || January 17, 2015 || Haleakala || Pan-STARRS ||  || align=right data-sort-value="0.94" | 940 m || 
|-id=962 bgcolor=#fefefe
| 538962 ||  || — || March 13, 2016 || Haleakala || Pan-STARRS ||  || align=right data-sort-value="0.79" | 790 m || 
|-id=963 bgcolor=#fefefe
| 538963 ||  || — || April 9, 2003 || Kitt Peak || Spacewatch ||  || align=right data-sort-value="0.82" | 820 m || 
|-id=964 bgcolor=#FA8072
| 538964 ||  || — || October 30, 2011 || Kitt Peak || Spacewatch ||  || align=right data-sort-value="0.92" | 920 m || 
|-id=965 bgcolor=#E9E9E9
| 538965 ||  || — || July 14, 2004 || Siding Spring || SSS ||  || align=right | 1.4 km || 
|-id=966 bgcolor=#d6d6d6
| 538966 ||  || — || June 12, 2010 || WISE || WISE ||  || align=right | 3.6 km || 
|-id=967 bgcolor=#FA8072
| 538967 ||  || — || February 10, 2016 || Haleakala || Pan-STARRS ||  || align=right data-sort-value="0.64" | 640 m || 
|-id=968 bgcolor=#fefefe
| 538968 ||  || — || January 20, 2015 || Mount Lemmon || Mount Lemmon Survey ||  || align=right data-sort-value="0.91" | 910 m || 
|-id=969 bgcolor=#fefefe
| 538969 ||  || — || March 4, 2016 || Haleakala || Pan-STARRS ||  || align=right data-sort-value="0.57" | 570 m || 
|-id=970 bgcolor=#d6d6d6
| 538970 ||  || — || August 4, 2010 || WISE || WISE ||  || align=right | 2.8 km || 
|-id=971 bgcolor=#d6d6d6
| 538971 ||  || — || November 2, 2008 || Mount Lemmon || Mount Lemmon Survey ||  || align=right | 2.4 km || 
|-id=972 bgcolor=#d6d6d6
| 538972 ||  || — || December 19, 2007 || Mount Lemmon || Mount Lemmon Survey ||  || align=right | 3.7 km || 
|-id=973 bgcolor=#E9E9E9
| 538973 ||  || — || November 17, 2009 || Mount Lemmon || Mount Lemmon Survey ||  || align=right | 2.5 km || 
|-id=974 bgcolor=#E9E9E9
| 538974 ||  || — || June 16, 2012 || Mount Lemmon || Mount Lemmon Survey ||  || align=right data-sort-value="0.80" | 800 m || 
|-id=975 bgcolor=#d6d6d6
| 538975 ||  || — || August 26, 2012 || Haleakala || Pan-STARRS ||  || align=right | 1.9 km || 
|-id=976 bgcolor=#fefefe
| 538976 ||  || — || September 18, 2006 || Kitt Peak || Spacewatch ||  || align=right data-sort-value="0.62" | 620 m || 
|-id=977 bgcolor=#d6d6d6
| 538977 ||  || — || November 6, 2013 || Haleakala || Pan-STARRS ||  || align=right | 3.2 km || 
|-id=978 bgcolor=#E9E9E9
| 538978 ||  || — || May 13, 2016 || Haleakala || Pan-STARRS ||  || align=right data-sort-value="0.94" | 940 m || 
|-id=979 bgcolor=#FFC2E0
| 538979 ||  || — || December 25, 2005 || Mount Lemmon || Mount Lemmon Survey || AMOcritical || align=right data-sort-value="0.43" | 430 m || 
|-id=980 bgcolor=#d6d6d6
| 538980 ||  || — || December 11, 2013 || Haleakala || Pan-STARRS ||  || align=right | 2.6 km || 
|-id=981 bgcolor=#E9E9E9
| 538981 ||  || — || April 5, 2011 || Kitt Peak || Spacewatch ||  || align=right | 1.6 km || 
|-id=982 bgcolor=#d6d6d6
| 538982 ||  || — || April 12, 2015 || Haleakala || Pan-STARRS ||  || align=right | 2.6 km || 
|-id=983 bgcolor=#d6d6d6
| 538983 ||  || — || May 17, 2016 || Haleakala || Pan-STARRS ||  || align=right | 2.2 km || 
|-id=984 bgcolor=#fefefe
| 538984 ||  || — || March 13, 2005 || Kitt Peak || Spacewatch ||  || align=right data-sort-value="0.75" | 750 m || 
|-id=985 bgcolor=#fefefe
| 538985 ||  || — || October 21, 2003 || Kitt Peak || Spacewatch ||  || align=right data-sort-value="0.75" | 750 m || 
|-id=986 bgcolor=#E9E9E9
| 538986 ||  || — || December 4, 2005 || Kitt Peak || Spacewatch ||  || align=right | 1.4 km || 
|-id=987 bgcolor=#E9E9E9
| 538987 ||  || — || May 11, 2007 || Mount Lemmon || Mount Lemmon Survey ||  || align=right | 1.9 km || 
|-id=988 bgcolor=#d6d6d6
| 538988 ||  || — || February 3, 2010 || WISE || WISE ||  || align=right | 3.2 km || 
|-id=989 bgcolor=#d6d6d6
| 538989 ||  || — || November 23, 2008 || Kitt Peak || Spacewatch ||  || align=right | 2.8 km || 
|-id=990 bgcolor=#E9E9E9
| 538990 ||  || — || December 29, 2005 || Kitt Peak || Spacewatch ||  || align=right | 1.2 km || 
|-id=991 bgcolor=#fefefe
| 538991 ||  || — || March 25, 2006 || Kitt Peak || Spacewatch ||  || align=right data-sort-value="0.66" | 660 m || 
|-id=992 bgcolor=#fefefe
| 538992 ||  || — || June 5, 2005 || Kitt Peak || Spacewatch ||  || align=right data-sort-value="0.75" | 750 m || 
|-id=993 bgcolor=#d6d6d6
| 538993 ||  || — || October 4, 1996 || Kitt Peak || Spacewatch ||  || align=right | 3.2 km || 
|-id=994 bgcolor=#fefefe
| 538994 ||  || — || May 2, 2006 || Mount Lemmon || Mount Lemmon Survey ||  || align=right data-sort-value="0.79" | 790 m || 
|-id=995 bgcolor=#fefefe
| 538995 ||  || — || March 27, 2012 || Mount Lemmon || Mount Lemmon Survey ||  || align=right | 1.2 km || 
|-id=996 bgcolor=#d6d6d6
| 538996 ||  || — || December 2, 2013 || Mount Lemmon || Mount Lemmon Survey ||  || align=right | 2.8 km || 
|-id=997 bgcolor=#d6d6d6
| 538997 ||  || — || December 29, 2014 || Haleakala || Pan-STARRS ||  || align=right | 2.8 km || 
|-id=998 bgcolor=#fefefe
| 538998 ||  || — || January 10, 2008 || Catalina || CSS ||  || align=right data-sort-value="0.69" | 690 m || 
|-id=999 bgcolor=#E9E9E9
| 538999 ||  || — || November 10, 2013 || Kitt Peak || Spacewatch ||  || align=right | 1.6 km || 
|-id=000 bgcolor=#d6d6d6
| 539000 ||  || — || October 26, 2008 || Mount Lemmon || Mount Lemmon Survey ||  || align=right | 2.2 km || 
|}

References

External links 
 Discovery Circumstances: Numbered Minor Planets (535001)–(540000) (IAU Minor Planet Center)

0538